= Housebarn =

Building that is a combination of a house and a barn

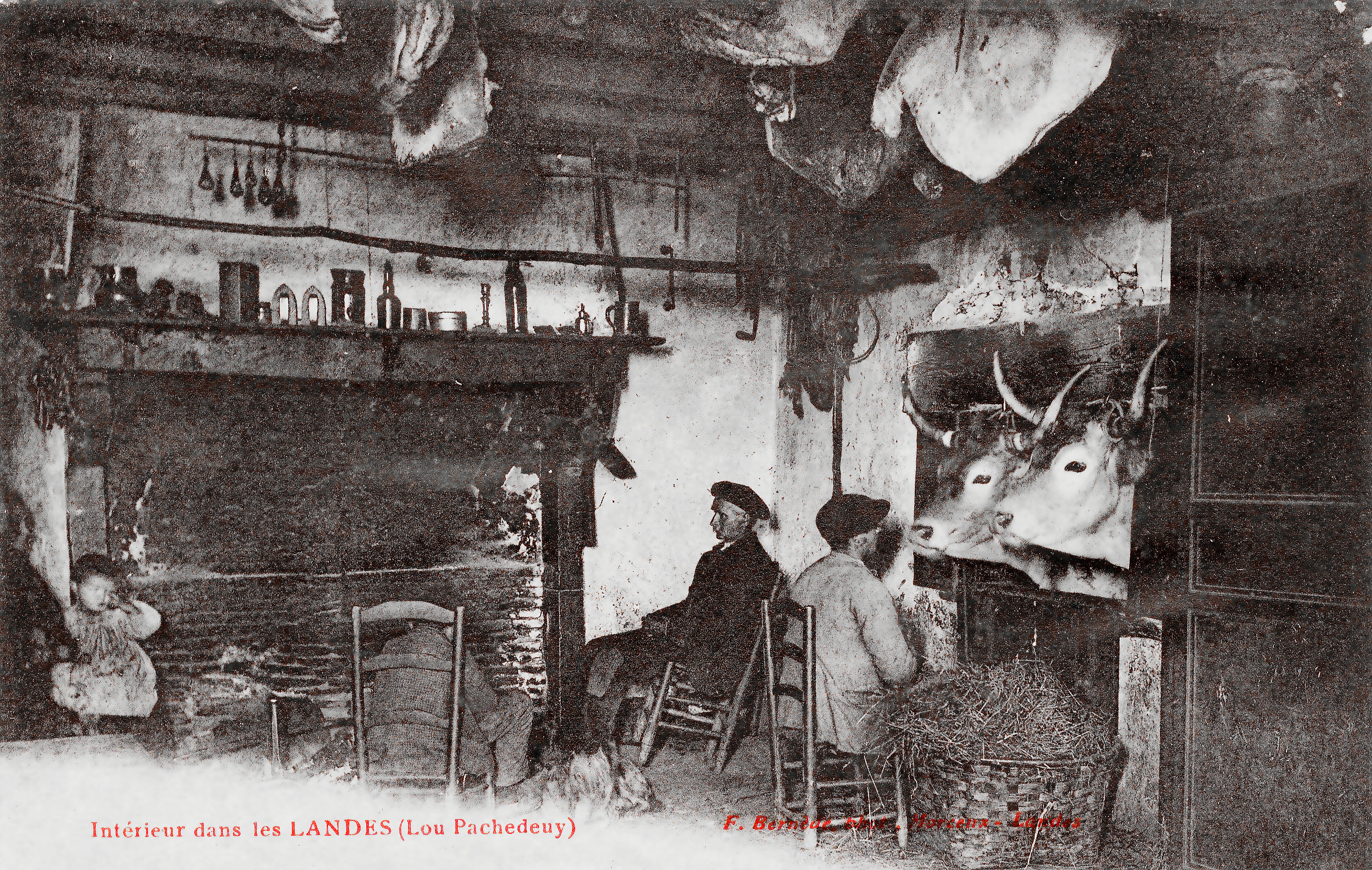
A postcard photograph inside a maison landaise

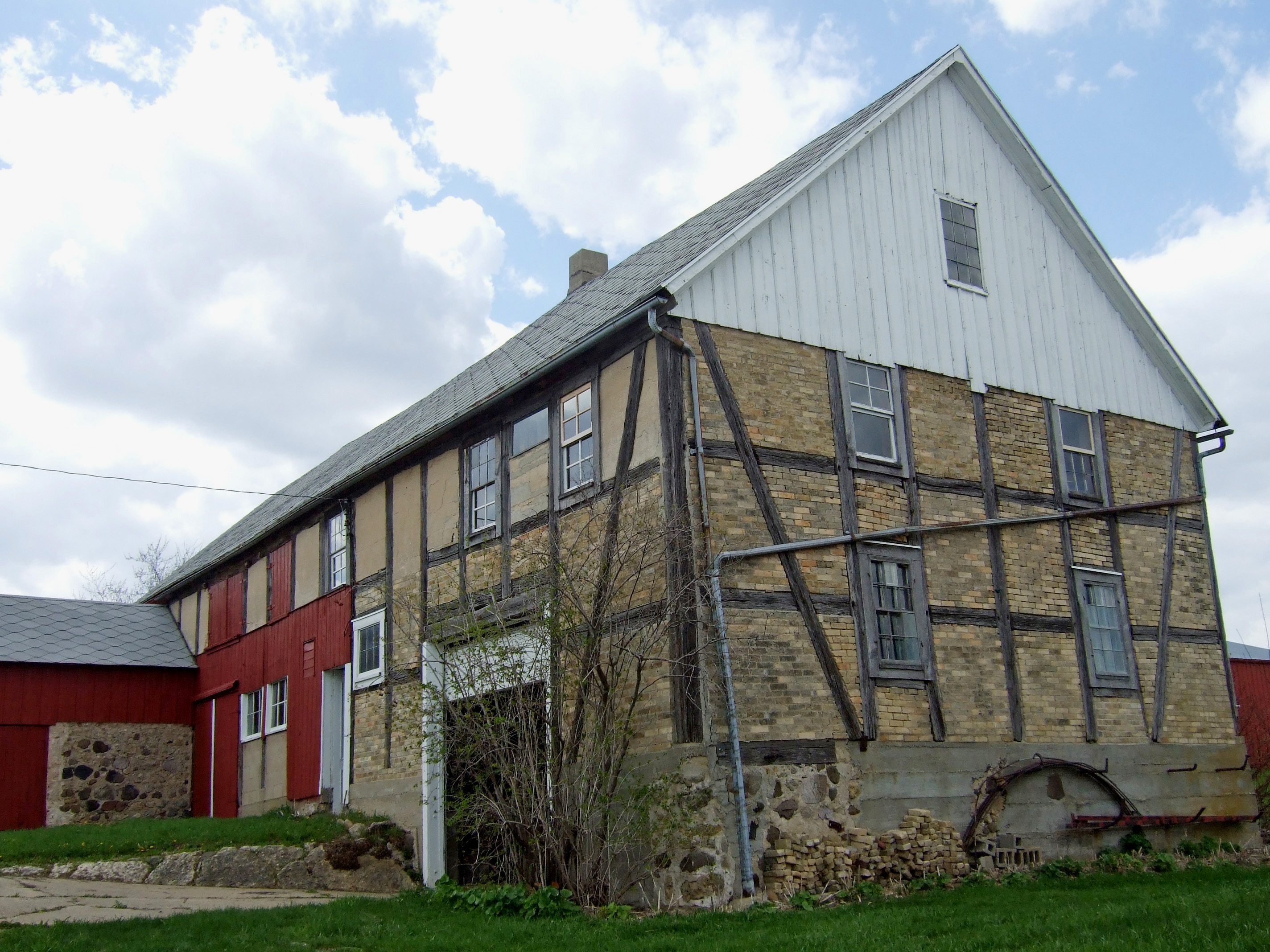
Kliese Housebarn in Emmet, Wisconsin, U.S.A. Built ca. 1850 for Friedrich Kliese, an immigrant from Silesia

A housebarn (also house-barn or house barn) is a building that is a combination of a house and a barn under the same roof. Most types of housebarn also have room for livestock quarters. If the living quarters are only combined with a byre, whereas the cereals are stored outside the main building, the house is called a byre-dwelling.

== Styles ==
There are several styles of housebarns. One style is a building where the barn portion shares a wall with the house portion. Sometimes the house portion will extend into part of the loft on the second storey of the barn portion.

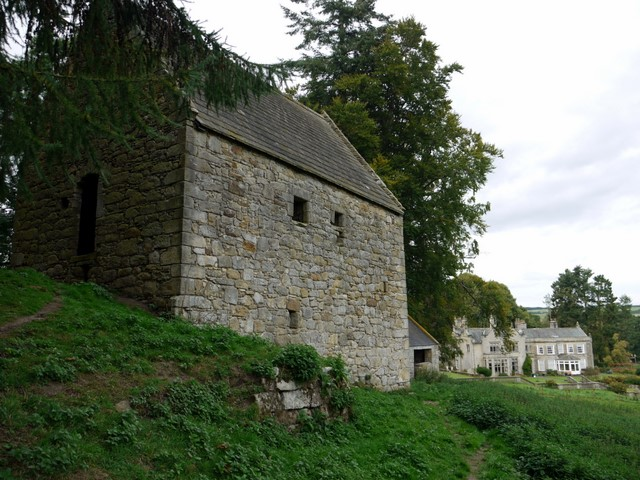
Outside view of Woodhouses Bastle

Another style features the barn as the lower portion of the building and the house as the second floor such as the Black Forest-style house. Similarly but for different reasons, some defensive house structures such as the bastle house and some tower houses combine animals on the ground floor and living quarters above, a security measure against raids. For example, bastle houses are found along the Anglo-Scottish border, in areas formerly plagued by border Reivers.

== History ==
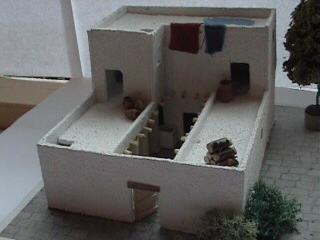
A model of a typical Israelite four-room house

Housebarns were built beginning in prehistoric times after people discovered that the body heat of animals helps to warm human living areas. The ancient four room house is an Iron Age type highly identified with the ancient Israelites.

Living with livestock in the combined building also allowed people to be able to prevent thieves from stealing their animals. Housebarns were developed in western Europe, Scandinavia, and the British Isles and continued being built into the 19th century. The first three designs in the 1839 edition of An Encyclopædia of Cottage, Farm, and Villa Architecture and Furniture... were for combined living space for the farm family and their animals. Immigrants to North America rarely built housebarns; they typically divided the barn and house functions into separate buildings although part of New England in particular is known for its connected farms.

== Advantages and disadvantages ==
Owners have stated that they find it convenient to not have to walk outside while feeding or watching a medical issue such as birth of animal young. They often can hear the animal noises, which can be disruptive or helpful when an animal has problems.

One American builder estimates that 5% of its buildings have an attached living area, some of which are small apartments. They cite several concerns about building a housebarn. Since fewer people are interested in owning a living quarters attached to the house, housebarns have a more limited marketability. This causes lending institutions to be less likely to grant a loan. Bankers are less likely to accept housebarns as collateral. Housebarns are more costly to insure since they are treated like barns, which have a higher risk of fire. The house portion may get unwanted pests that are common in barns like mice, flies, and birds.

== Distribution ==
=== Austria ===
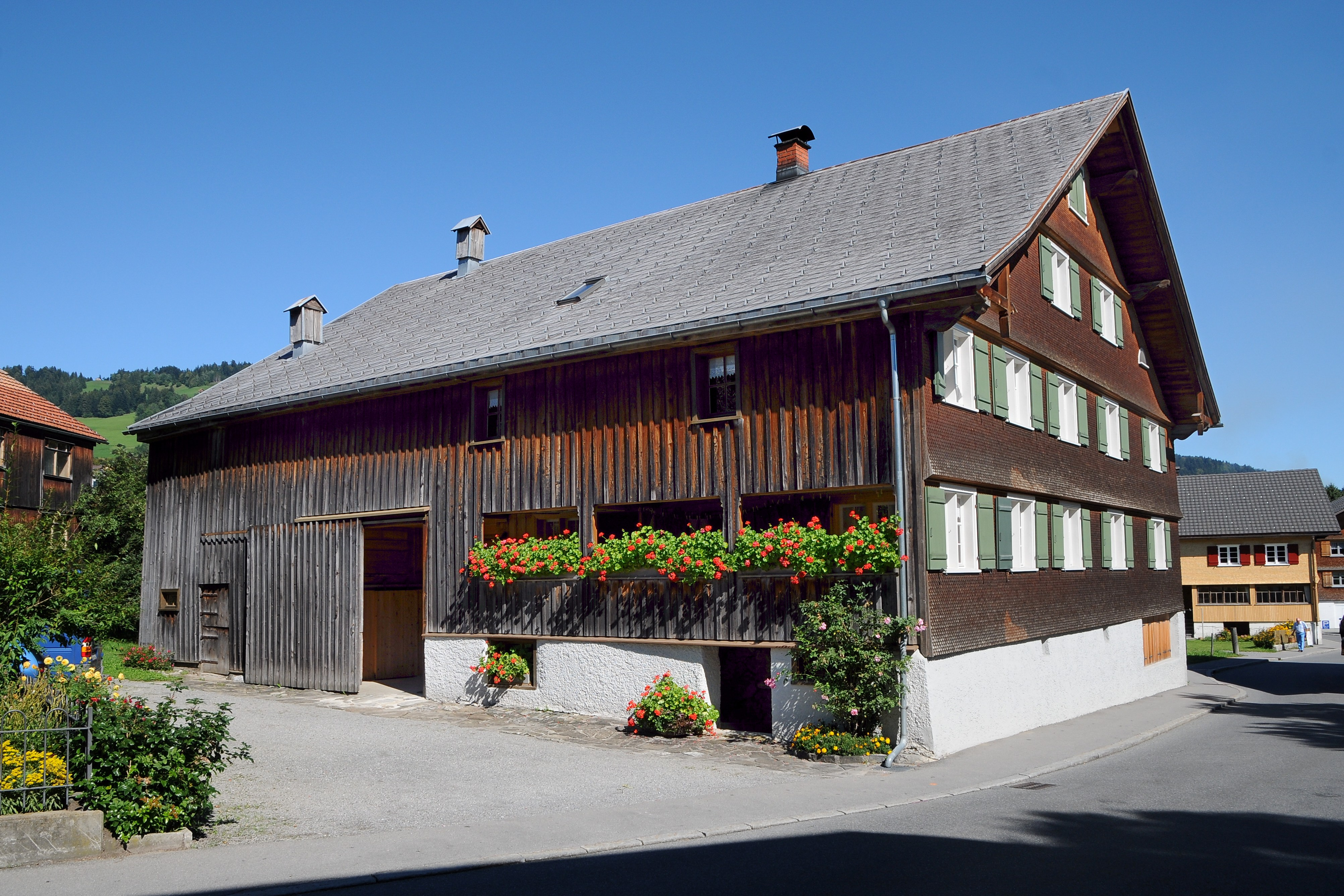
The Bregenzerwälderhaus. This specific building in Schwarzenberg, Vorarlberg (Austria) is listed as a protected building.

- Zwerchhof is found in eastern and southeastern Austria. A brief description of similar house types is at the open-air museum Museumsdorf Niedersulz.
- Engadinerhaus, see below in section on Switzerland.
- Vierkanter or Vierkanthof are courtyard farms. The courtyard is formed by walls of a large building or the placement of several buildings creating an enclosed courtyard.
- The Bregenzerwälderhaus is a housebarn from the Bregenz Forest in Vorarlberg

=== Belgium ===
In Belgium, most of farms were housebarns, referred to as Langgevelboerderij (long-facade farm) in Dutch and simply cinse (farm) in Walloon, then ferme in French. They were located in the heart of the village until the early 1950s. At that time, barns, at first, then stables began to be built outside the main building, or even outside the village.

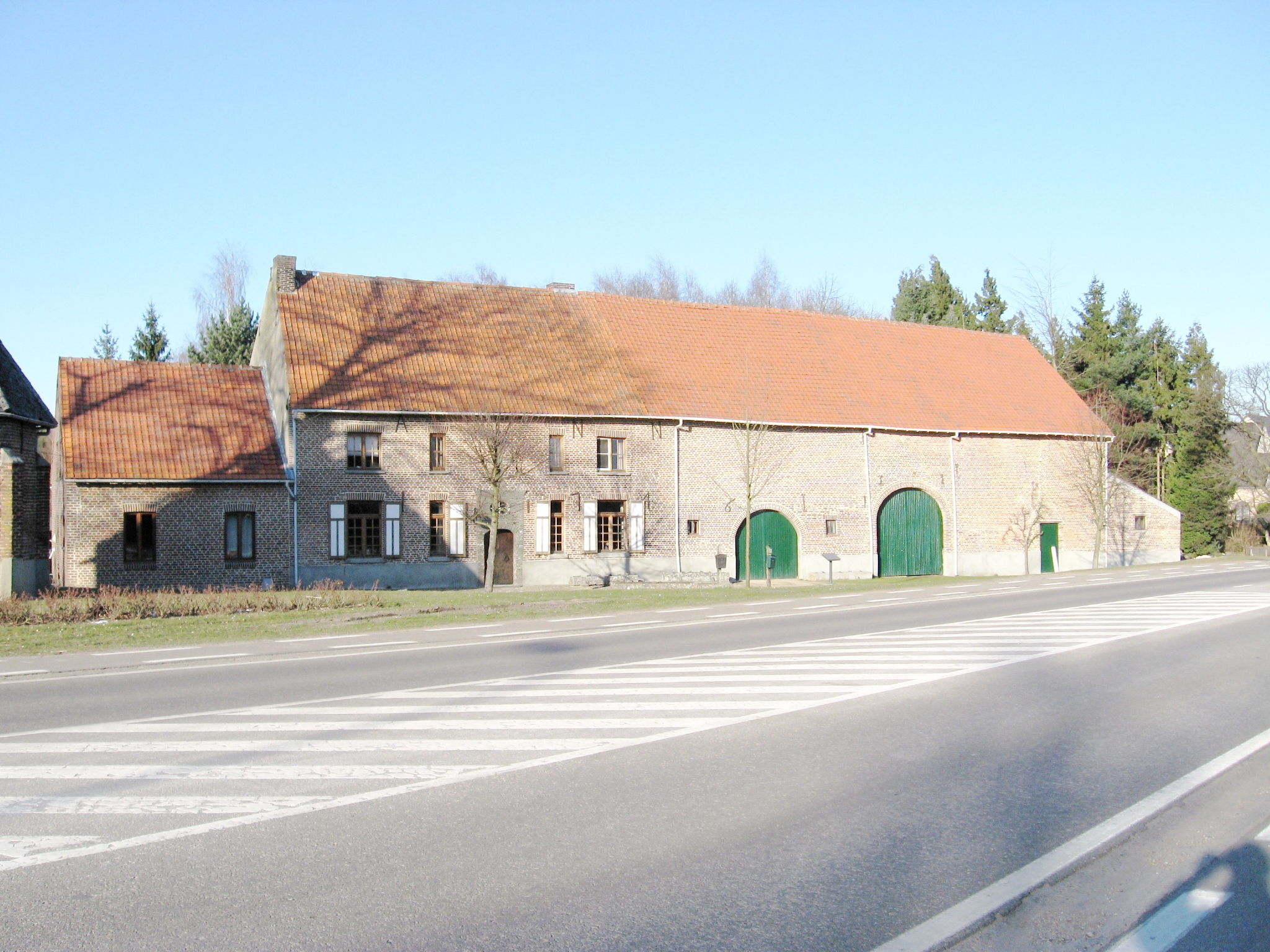
Housebarn at Houthalen, Limburg (dwelling left, cow stable in the middle, forage barn right)

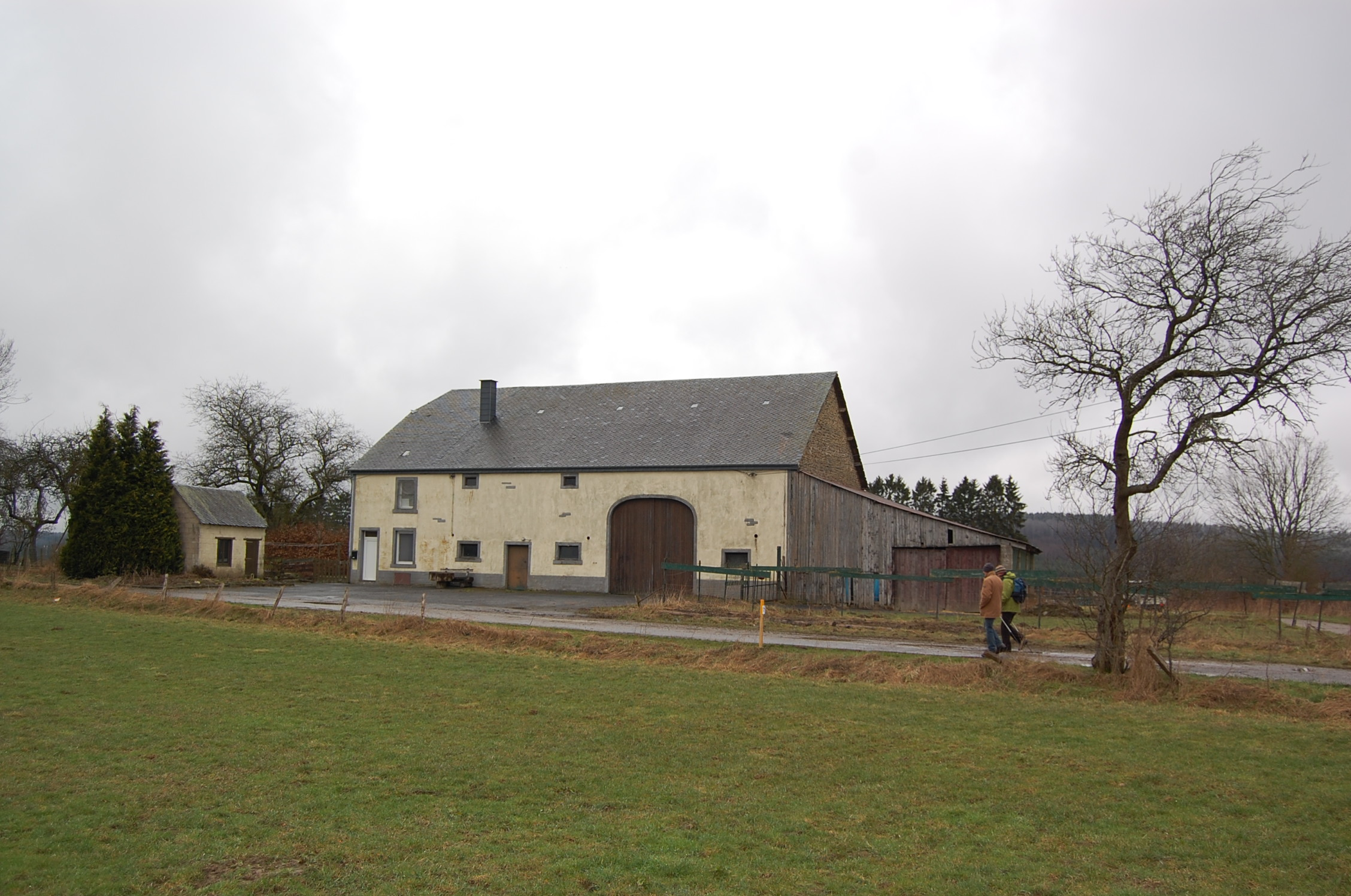
Housebarn in Villance, in the Ardennes (same structure, except stable door)

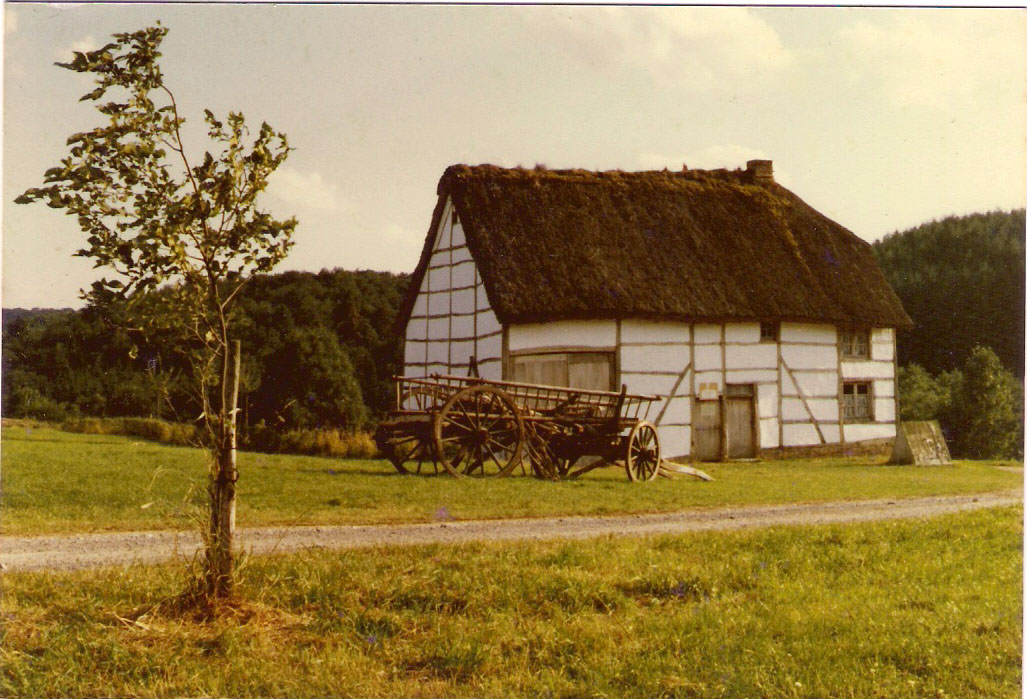
Old type, same structure, forage barn left (outside museum of Awenne, Saint-Hubert)

=== Canada ===
- Mennonite settlers from the Russian Empire emigrated to Western Canada beginning in 1874. Originating in the Netherlands, they continued the practice of living in street villages and building housebarns for centuries and brought this practice to Canada. The largest collection of extant examples of Mennonite housebarns can be seen in the southern Manitoba villages of Neubergthal, Reinland, Sommerfeld, and other West Reserve villages, as well as at the Mennonite Heritage Village museum in Steinbach, Manitoba.

=== Estonia ===
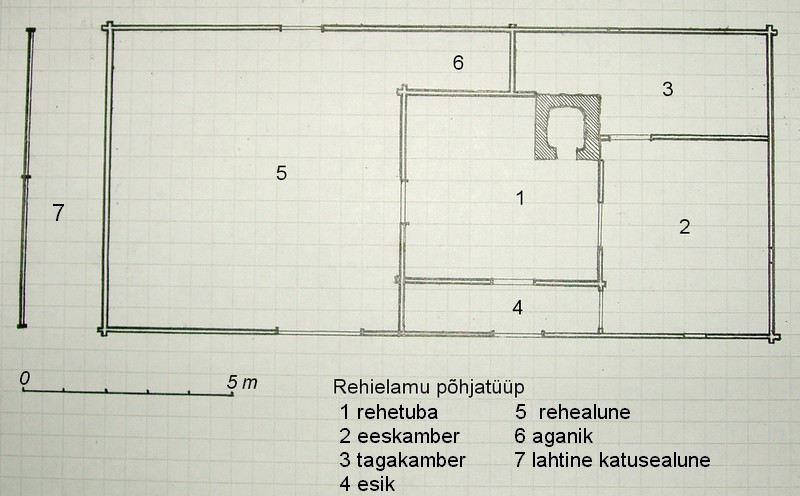
Northern type of Estonian traditional farmhouse (Rehielamu põhjatüüp). 1. is the "kiln", 2 and 3 are living space, 4 is an entryway, 5 is the barn.

- Rehielamu, The traditional Estonian farmhouse is a combined living space, "kiln" for cooking and drying crops, and threshing barn. The farmhouse is of two types, the põhjatüüp (northern type) and the Rehielamu lõunatüüp (southern type). No English article as of March 2013 but information is available at the Estonian Wikipedia written in Estonian.

=== France and Spain ===
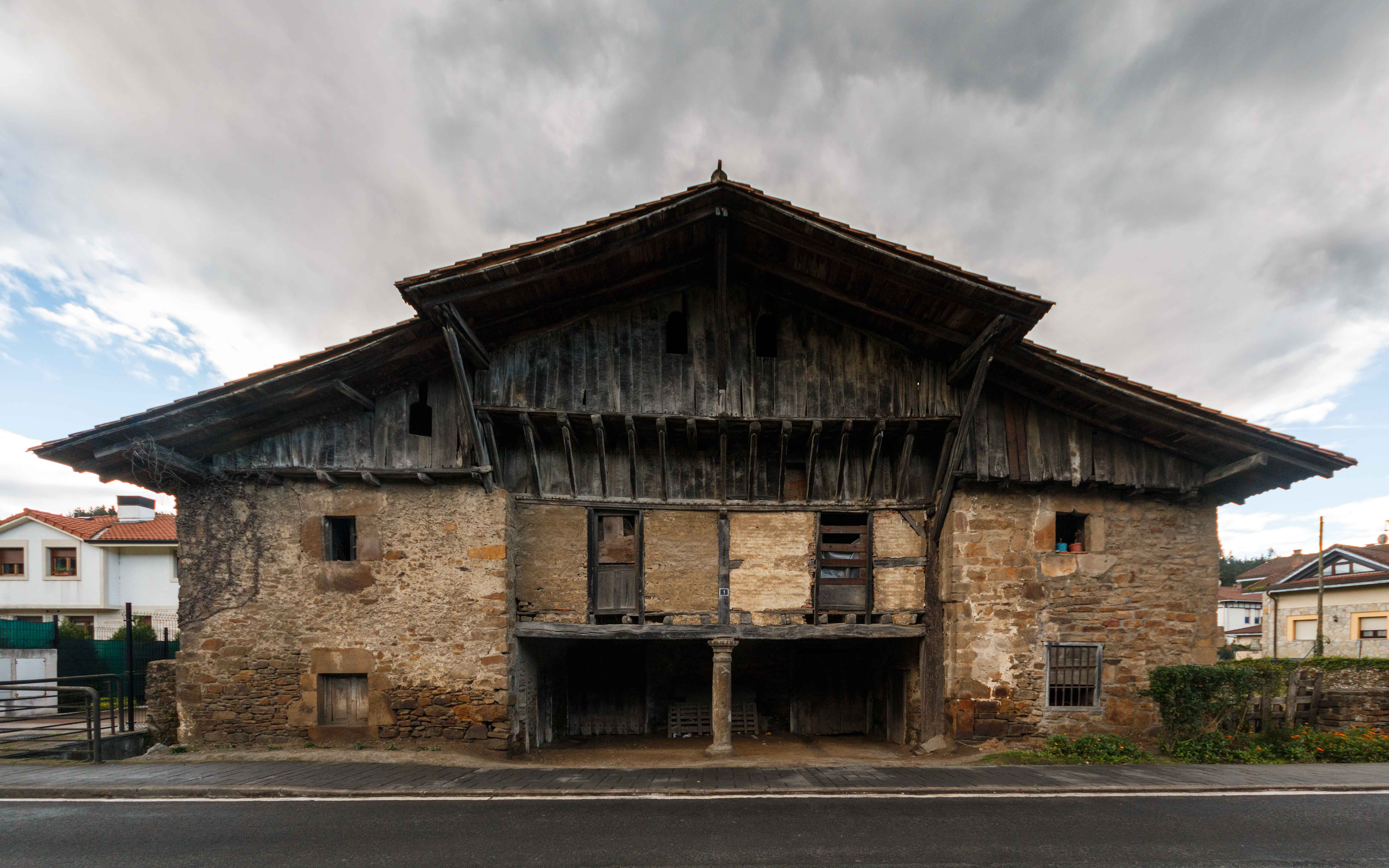
A baserri housebarn in Álava, Basque Country of Spain

- Mas and called the masia in Catalonia (Spain). These are two storey farmhouses with room for animals on the ground floor.
- Bresse Farmhouse (Ferme bressane, French; Bressehaus, German) - named for the Bresse region of France. Sometimes the Bresse farmhouse is a housebarn but they may have separate farm buildings.
- Maison landaise, the Landes house - has no uniformity but is sometimes a byre-dwelling. It is named for the region where it is found, the department of Landes in southwest France. For images see Category:Maison landaise.
- Lorraine House - see below in section on Germany
- Cabaña pasiega - Sometimes a house-barn, sometimes a warehouse and barn
- Baserri - A farmhouse in the Basque Country in northern Spain and southern France

=== Germany ===
Housebarns in Germany are generally called an einhaus (single-house or "all-in-one house"), eindachhof (one-roof-house) or wohnstallhaus (residential barn house).

The Middle German house group includes:

- Ernhaus (hall house, hall kitchen house). Ern is a Frankish word for the hall.
- Oberdeutsches Haus (Upper German house)
- Thüringisches Haus (Thuringian house)
- Fränkisches Haus (Frankish house)

The Middle German houses have a floor plan transverse to the walls where the Low German houses are longitudinal floor plan, three aisled buildings (dreischiffige).

The Low German house group extends from the Netherlands to East Prussia and includes:

- Flett-Deelen-Haus - a hall house with a very common floor plan including an open kitchen (flett) to the side of the hall (deele)
- Kübbungshaus - a hall house of two-post construction called a Zweiständerhaus, named after the side aisles called kübbungen
- Niedersachsenhaus (Low Saxon house)
- Sächsisches Haus (Saxon house)
- Altsächsisches Bauernhaus (Old Saxon farmhouse)
- Westfälisches Bauernhaus (Westphalian farmhouse)
- Westfalenhaus (Westphalian house)

The Gulf house (Gulfhaus) is named for the storage area called a gulf. Its range extends across the North Sea coastal regions from West Flanders to Elbe-Weser Triangle. The Gulf house developed from the Old Frisian farmhouse.

- Gulfhof (Gulf farmhouse)
- Ostfriesenhaus (East Frisian house)
- Haubarg - variant in Schleswig-Holstein, Germany

The Geestharden house named for the geography of part of the region it is found, the geest, in Northern Germany, Denmark, and northern Netherlands. The Geestharden, Gulf house (including its variant, the Haubarg) and the Low German hall house are the three basic, historic farmhouse types in the German state of Schleswig-Holstein.

- Uthland-Frisian house or Frisian house (Uthlandfriesische Haus or Friesenhaus in German) - found in Uthlande; a variant of the Geestharden house

Other house types in southern Germany include:

- Upper Swabian farmhouse (Oberschwäbischer Bauernhof) is found throughout Swabia (Bavaria) but mainly Upper Swabia.
- Lorraine house (Lothringerhaus or Lothringer Bauernhaus) is found in the Lorraine (region), France and Saarland, Germany. This floor plan is arranged transversely, in German called quereinhaus. They are stone, two-storey buildings.

The Upper Lusatian house or Umgebinde is another barn-house type found in a region in part of Germany, Poland and the Czech Republic, a wider range than the historical region of Upper Lusatia. This is a transversely divided Middle German house with unique construction features.

The Black Forest house group are found in southwest Germany in the Black Forest region and include:

- Heath house (Heidenhaus), or "hill house" (Höhenhaus), is by far the oldest form of Black Forest farmhouse, and is mostly found in the High Black Forest.
- Heath house in its newer form (Heidenhaus in seiner neueren form)
- Zarten house (Zartener Haus) tends to be found on level valley bottoms. Its name is derived from the villages of Zarten and Kirchzarten in the Dreisam Valley in the southern Black Forest.
- Schauinsland house (Schauinslandhaus), named after the local hill of Freiburg, the Schauinsland, is located in the high regions, near the summits of the southern Black Forest.
- Hotzen house (Hotzenhaus) found in the Hotzenwald
- Gutacher house (Gutacher Haus) is found on the eastern perimeter of the Black Forest. It is possibly the most typical form of farmhouse that is linked to the Black Forest.
- Kinzig Valley house (Kinzigtäler Haus)

Housebarns were common in the Schleswig-Holstein region of German in the 17th and 18th centuries.

=== Great Britain and Ireland ===
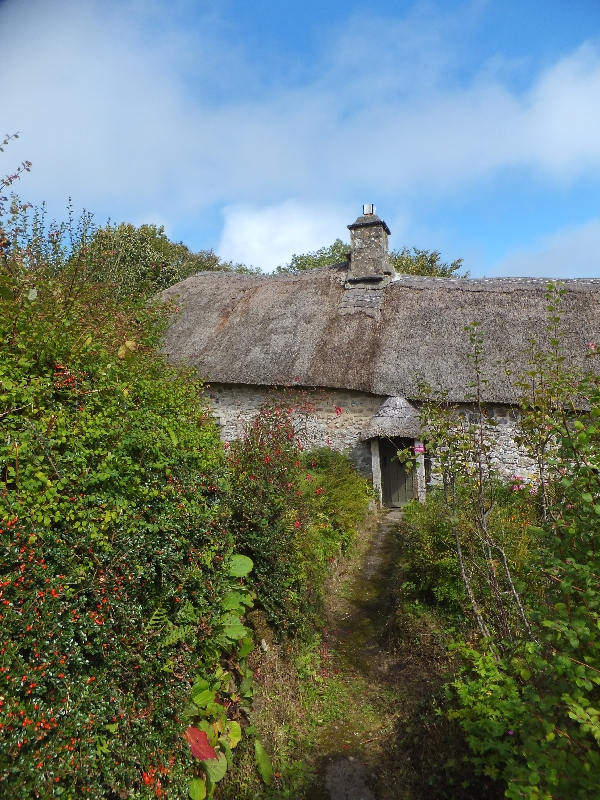
Higher Uppacott, Devon (c.1350) has been preserved as a definitive example of a Dartmoor longhouse with preserved medieval thatched roofing.

- Longhouses such as the Dartmoor longhouse are found in southwestern England; Cornwall, Devon, Wales, and lowland Scotland. A porched cross passage gave access to living quarters positioned on the upper slope with animal accommodation downslope to assist drainage.
- Bastle house, Scottish-English border. A two-storey building not found elsewhere in Britain. The ground floor used for animals, the upper floor for living space.
- Laithe house, upland Pennines. Barn, byre and living quarters combined into one building.
- Blackhouse (building), A traditional house-barn in the Scottish Highlands, the Hebrides, and Ireland.

=== Netherlands ===
Combined farmhouses and barns in a number of different styles can be found in several areas of the Netherlands. A general list of farm types in the Dutch language is here.

Hall-farmhouse group (hallenhuisboerderij) also known as the Low German house group:

- Langsdeeltype aisled barn type
- Dwarsdeeltype cross floor type
- Hallenhuisboerderij (Hall house farmhouse)
- Langgevelboerderij (long facade farmhouse) found in North Brabant, Limburg and neighboring parts of Belgium. These developed from the hall house and consist of a long building that faces the road, with the house at one end.
  - Krukboerderij L-shaped farm, found in Betuwe
  - T-boerderij or betuwse boerderij, found in Overijssel, Utrecht and South Holland, these combined houses and barns are similar to the kop-rompboerderijen, but the farmhouse forms the crossbar of a letter 'T', with the barn forming the stem.
- Los hoes boerderij (loose house) are found around Twente, Overijssel. These buildings were originally open inside. The farmer and his family sharing the same space as the livestock, thus the name loose house.

Cross house group (dwarshuisgroep):

- Separate buildings for housing, barn, stall, etc. arranged in an L shape U shape or courtyard.
- Middenlimburgse (Middle Limburg type) developed two parallel buildings.
- Drentse-boerderij, found in Drenthe and northern Overijssel. These elongated buildings are often thatched.

Northern house group (noordelijke huisgroep) also called the Frisian house group (Friese huisgroep):

- Kop-hals-rompboerderij (head-neck-rump farmhouse) is known in English as the Frisian farmhouse. Found in Friesland and western Groningen, these buildings consist of three sections, the kop (head) containing the house, the hals (neck) being a small linking section, and the romp (rump) being the barn; so-named from the similar appearance of a recumbent cow. This house type is descended from the Old Frisian longhouse.
  - Bildtse boerderij Bildts farmhouse is a Kop-hals-rompboerderij but with the house and neck turned to form an L-shaped farm and the cows face the middle aisle. The name id derived from this type being concentrated around the province of het Bildt.
- Kop-rompboerderij (head-rump farmhouse) are found in Friesland and western Groningen. These farmhouses are similar to the kop-hals-rompborderijen, but the house is joined directly to the barn.
- the Ameland and Terschelling development
- Oldambtster boerderij, found in the Oldambt region of eastern Groningen (province). The house roof is usually tiled, while the barn roof is thatched.
- Stolpboerderij, known as Haubarg in German. These consist of a square, pyramid roof building. The roofs of these buildings may be fully tiled or part tiled, part thatched. The house part of these buildings may present an ornate facade. This type of building is found in North Holland.
- Stelpboerderij are very similar to the stolpboerderij but are rectangular and are found in Friesland.
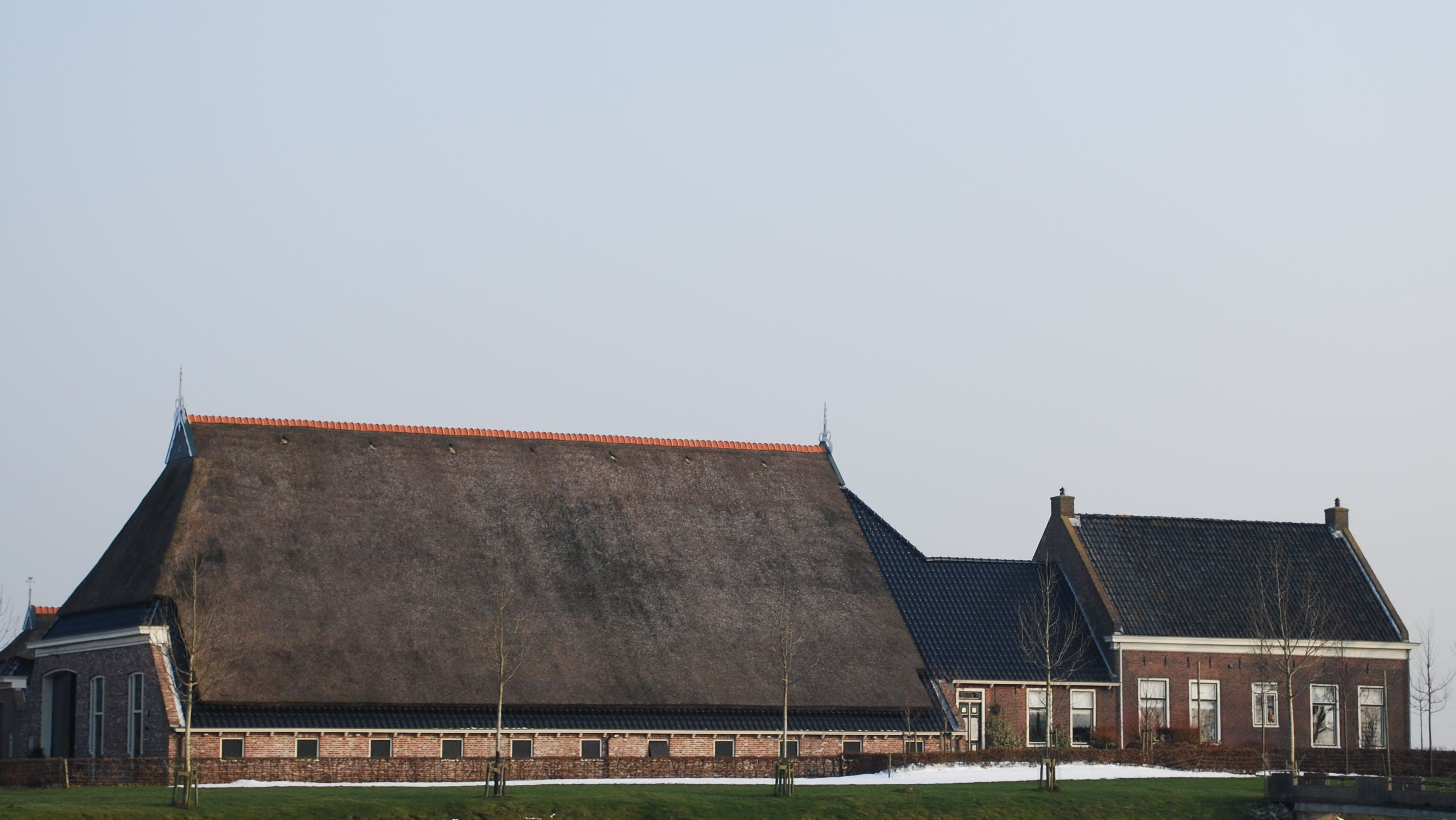
A kop-hals-rompboerderij in Kollum, Friesland, Netherlands

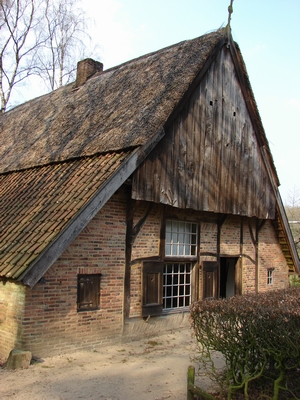
A loes hoes boerderij at the Netherlands Open Air Museum, Arnhem.

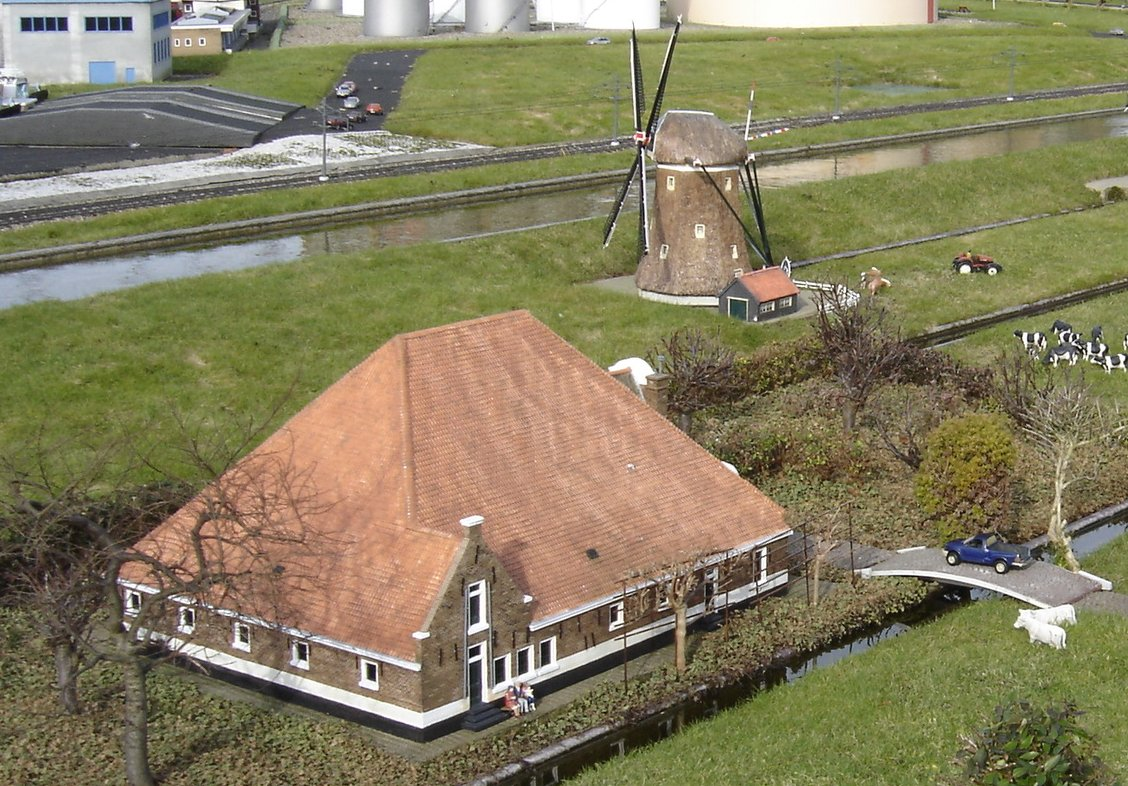
Stolpboerderij

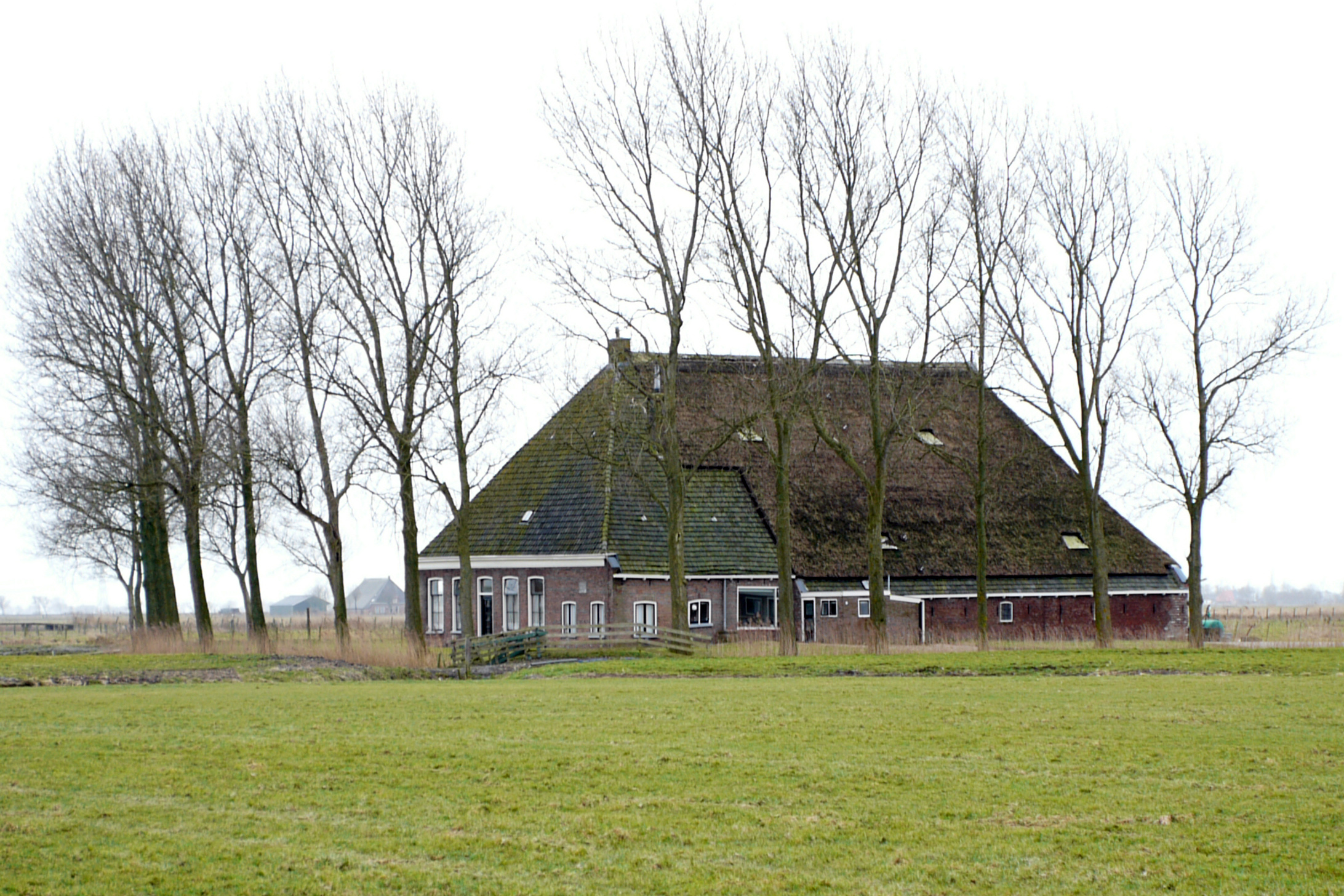
stelpboerderij

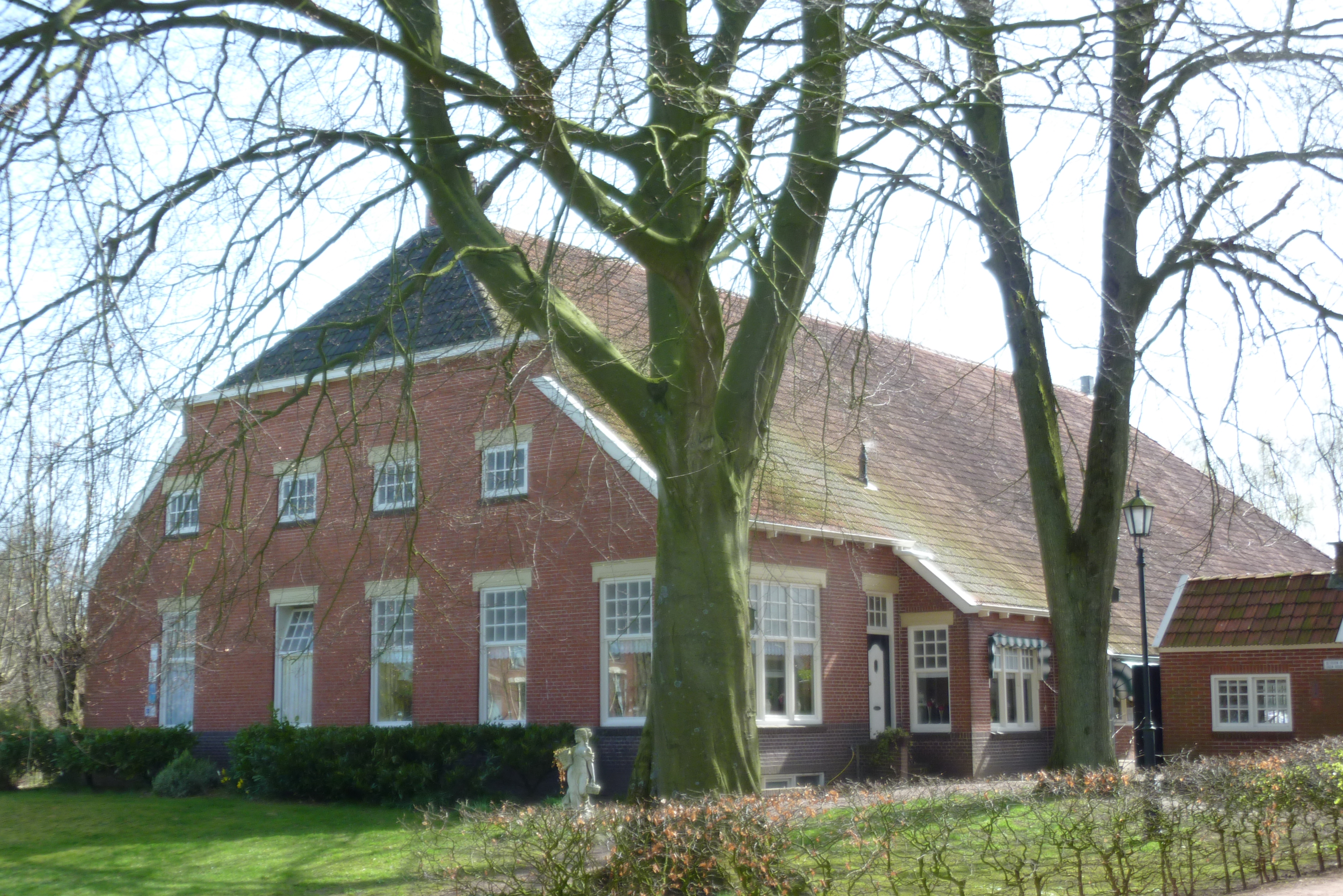
Oldambtster boerderij. The house is narrower than the barn, the ridges are in-line.

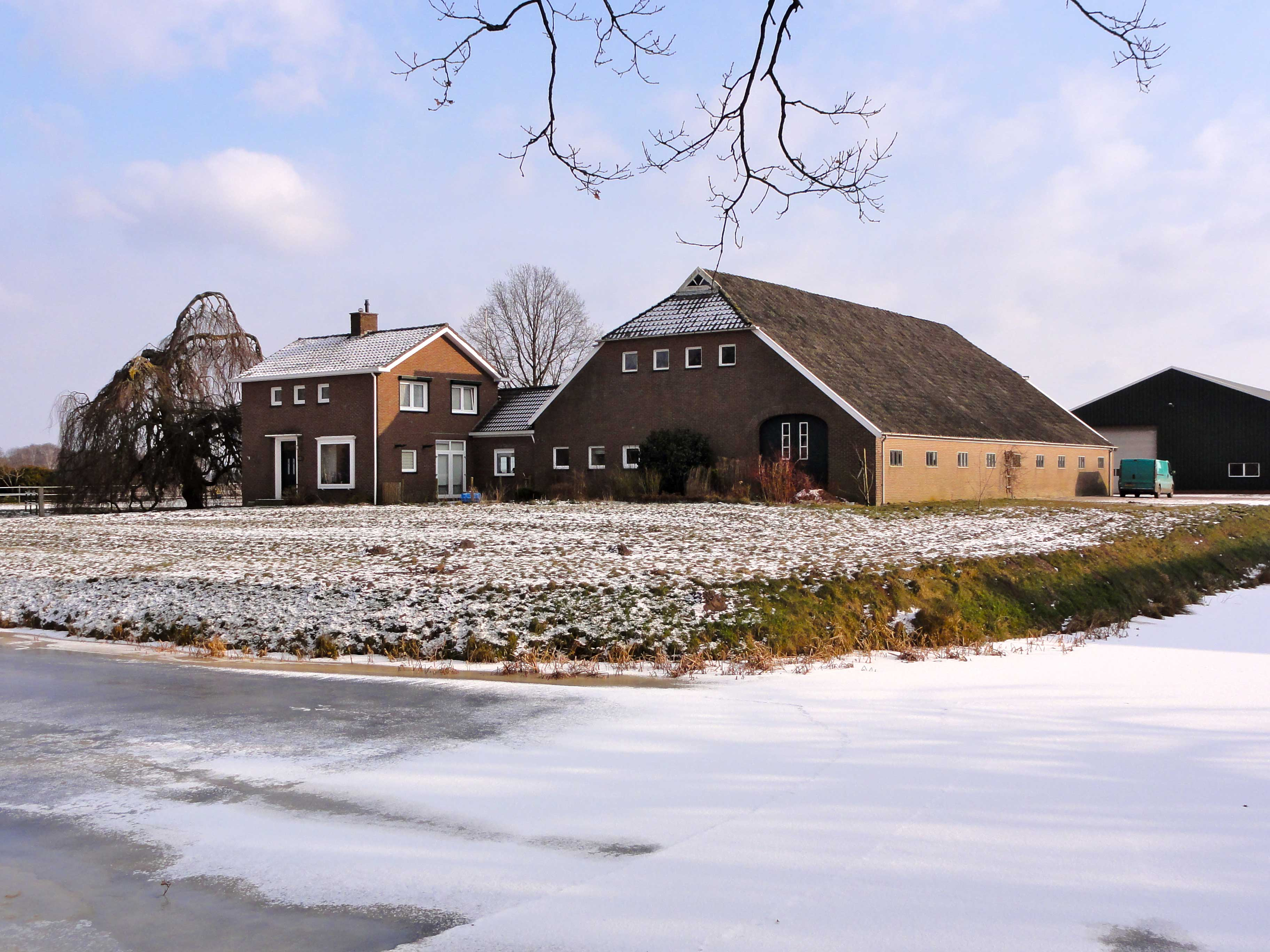
Krukboerderij

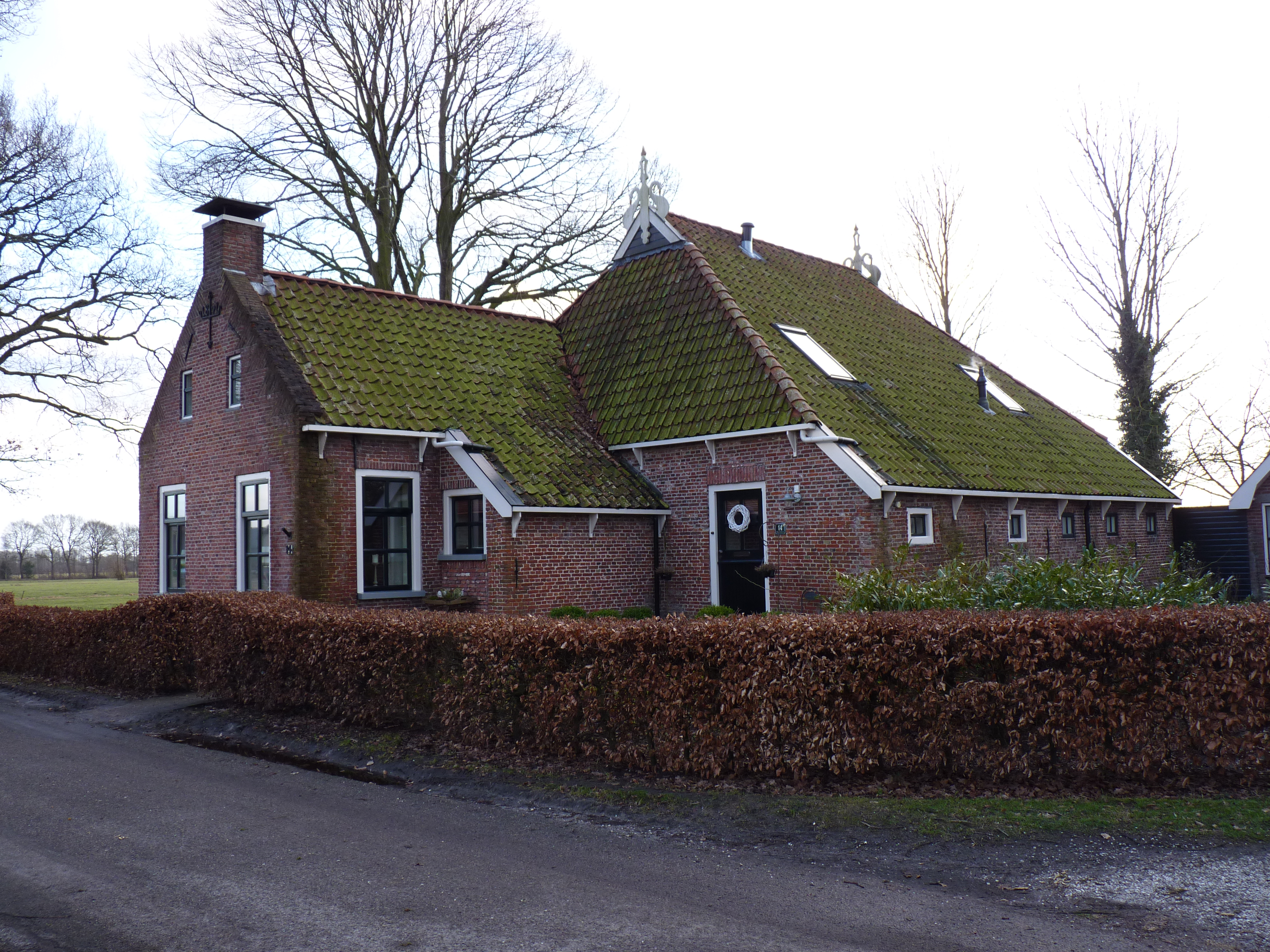
Kop-rompboerderij in Opsterland

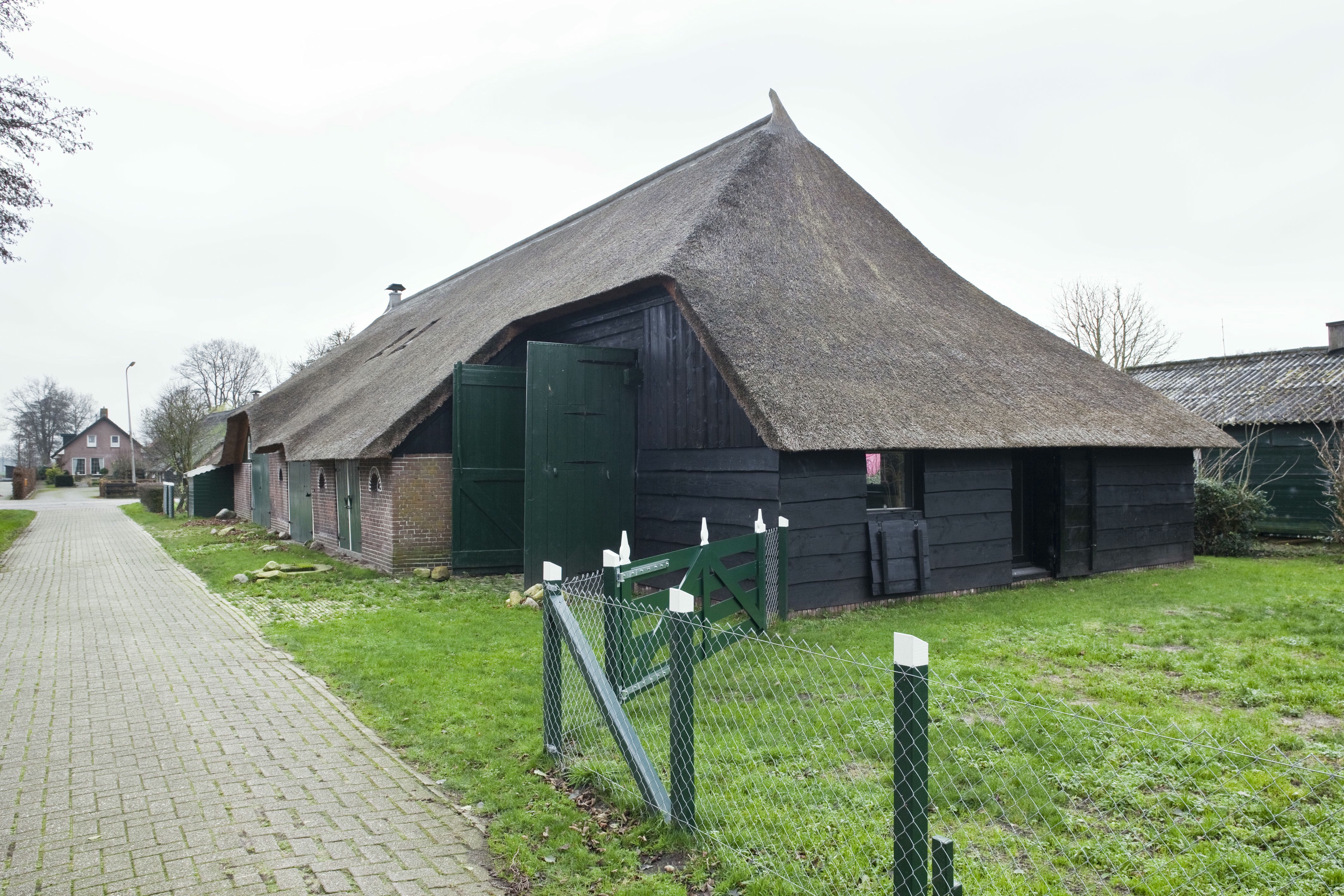
Dwarsdeelboerderij

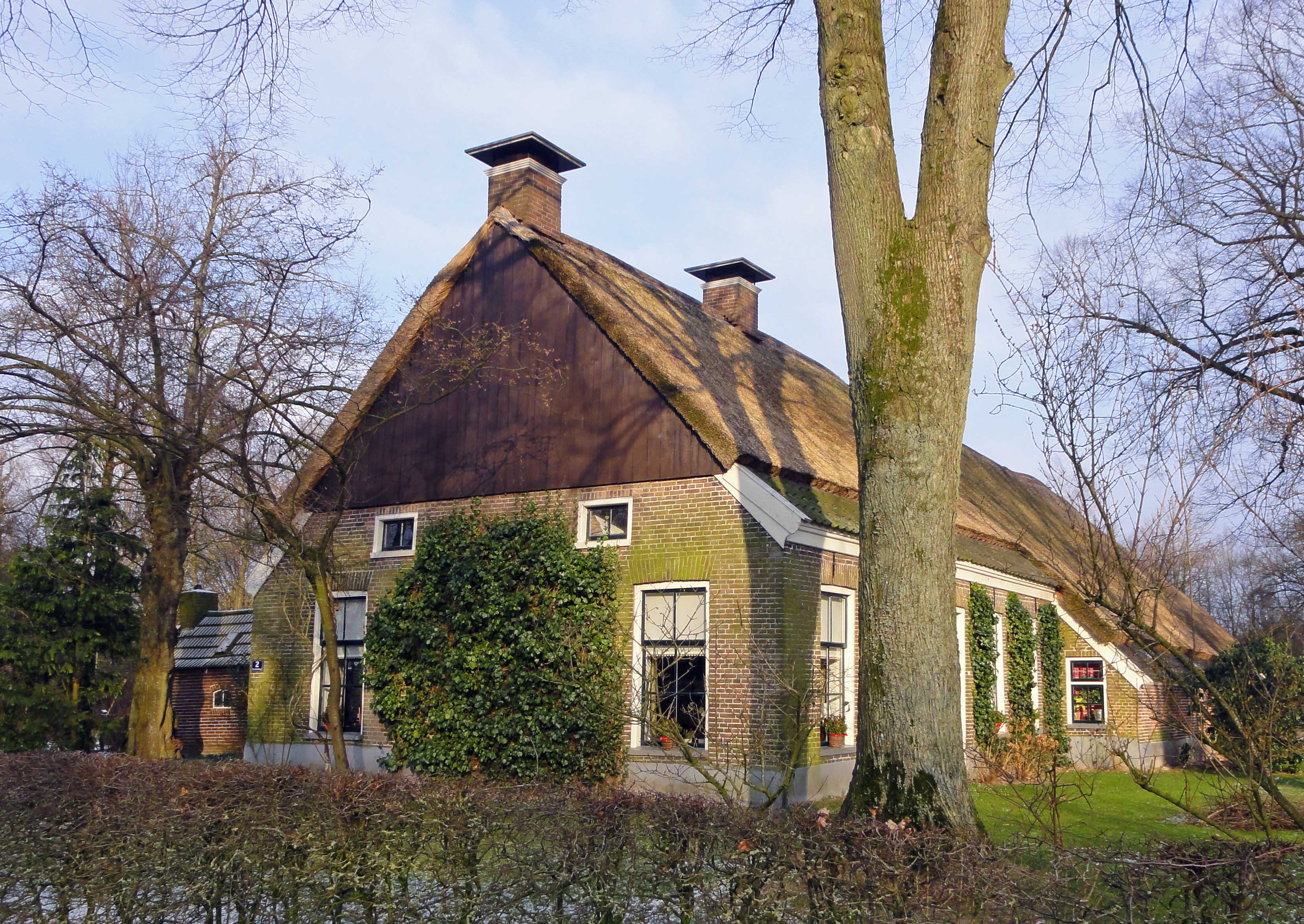
Hallenhuisboerderij

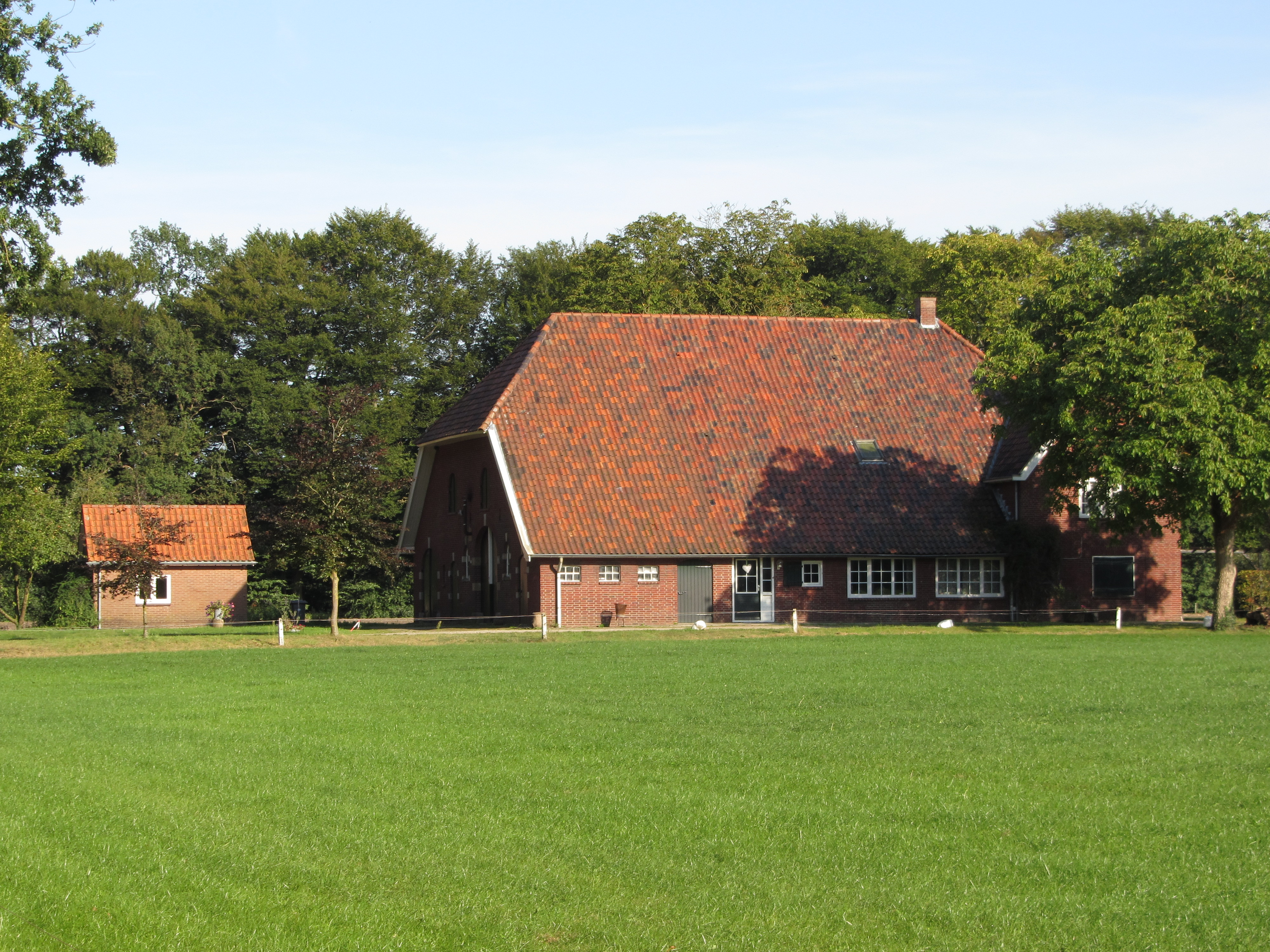
Dwarshuistype

=== Poland ===
- Mennonite settlers from The Netherlands settled in the Vistula Delta near Gdańsk (then part of Prussia) in the 16th century, where they built housebarns. Some moved to the Russian Empire, and later North America, where they continued this practice.

=== Switzerland ===
- Chalet in the Swiss Alps
- Engadinerhaus (German) a stone, three-storey house type in the Engadin, Vinschgau, and valleys in the Swiss Alps and part of Tyrol (state), Austria. See Commons:Engadinerhaus

=== Ukraine ===
- Mennonite settlers from Prussia immigrated to South Russia, now Ukraine, beginning in the 1770s. Many of them settled in reserves near what is now Zaporizhia and continued the practice of living in street villages and building housebarns, some of which are still extant today. Most of the Mennonites in this region immigrated to Canada and the United States beginning in the 1870s, where they continued to build housebarns.

=== United States ===
Housebarns are more prevalent in areas that were settled by German immigrants. There are twelve historic housebarns in the United States. Many of these housebarns are listed on the National Register of Historic Places:

- Lutze Housebarn in Newton, Wisconsin. It is one of two remaining buildings of its construction in the United States.
- Wilhelm Pelster House-Barn in New Haven, Missouri
- Jacob Weins House-Barn
- Peter Wittmayer House-Barn
- Wilhelm Moser House-Barn
- Alex Seitaniemi Housebarn
- John and Kate Merkwan Rubblestone House-Barn
- Martin and Wilhelminn Grosz House-Barn
- Kliese Housebarn
- Enoch Hofer House-Barn
- Wihelm Ziegler House-Barn
- Das Haus, Einhaus und Der Stall, Niagara Falls (Bergholz), NY

== See also ==
- Barndominium
- List of house types
