= Lorraine (disambiguation) =

Lorraine is a cultural and historical region in northeastern France.

Lorraine may also refer to:

== People and fictional characters ==
- Lorraine (given name), including a list of people and fictional characters
- Lorraine (surname), including a list of people

== Places ==
=== Africa ===
==== South Africa ====
- Lorraine, Limpopo, a town in Limpopo Province
- Lorraine, Port Elizabeth, a suburb of Port Elizabeth

=== Europe ===
- Duchy of Lorraine, which became the modern French region of Lorraine
- Lotharingia or Lorraine, a short-lived kingdom in western Europe, later an independent duchy
- Belgian Lorraine
- German Lorraine
- Lorraine Regional Natural Park, a protected area of northeastern France

=== North America ===
==== Canada ====
- Lorraine, Alberta
- Lorraine, Quebec, a suburb of Montreal
- Lorraine Formation, a geologic formation in Quebec
- Lorraine, a community within the city of Port Colborne, Ontario

==== United States ====
- Lorraine, Florida, an unincorporated area
- Lorraine, Kansas, a city
- Lorraine, Tangipahoa Parish, Louisiana, an unincorporated community
- Lorraine, New York, a town
  - Lorraine (CDP), New York, a hamlet and census-designated place in the town
- Lorraine, Virginia, an unincorporated community
- Lorraine Group, a geologic group in Tennessee

=== Elsewhere ===
- 1114 Lorraine, an asteroid
- Lorraine Island, Australia

== Arts and entertainment ==
=== Music ===
==== Groups ====
- Lorraine (band), a musical trio from Bergen, Norway

==== Albums ====
- Lorraine (album), a 2011 album from American folk music singer Lori McKenna

==== Songs ====
- "Lorraine" (My Beautiful Alsace Lorraine), a 1917 song written by Al Bryan and Fred Fisher
- "Lorraine", by The Allisons, 1961
- "Lorraine", by Bad Manners from Klass, 1983
- "Lorraine", by Freakwater, 1999
- "Lorraine", by Joey Dee and the Starliters, 1958
- "Lorraine", a song by Kaffe, Bulgaria's entry in the 2005 Eurovision song contest
- "Lorraine", by Stage Dolls from Stage Dolls, 1988
- "Lorraine", by Toto from Hydra, 1979

=== Television ===
- Lorraine (TV programme), a British breakfast television programme

== Computing and technology ==
- Lorraine, the workname used by Jay Miner for the first prototype of the Amiga computer
- Lorraine, codename for the Amiga Motorola 68000 chipset

== Military ==
- Battle of Lorraine, a World War I battle between France and Germany
- French battleship Lorraine, launched in 1913
- French frigate Lorraine, launched in 2020
- SMS Lothringen, a 1904 German pre-dreadnought of World War I, also known as Lorraine
- Operation Lorraine, a French Union military operation during the First Indochina War

== Transportation ==
- Lorraine (automobile), an American car manufacturer
- La Lorraine, a French automobile manufactured from 1899 to 1902
- Lorraine-Dietrich, a French automobile and aircraft engine manufacturer between 1920 and 1935; known as Lorraine from 1928 on
- Lorraine TGV station, a railway station located in Louvigny, France
- Lorraine railway viaduct, Bern, Switzerland

== Other uses ==
- House of Lorraine, which inherited the Duchy of Lorraine in 1473
- University of Lorraine, a public research university based in Lorraine, France
- List of storms named Lorraine, three tropical cyclones in the eastern Pacific Ocean
- Lorraine (cocktail)
- Lorraine Open, a defunct men's tennis tournament that was part of the Grand Prix tennis circuit from 1979 to 1989
- Lorraine Motel, site of the Martin Luther King, Jr. assassination

== See also ==
- Cercle de Lorraine, a business club in Brussels, Belgium
- Circuit de Lorraine, a bicycle racing event
- Lorraine cycle, a medieval narrative cycle
- Lorraine house, a type of house
- Little Lorraine, Cape Breton, Nova Scotia, Canada
- Lower Lorraine, a duchy
- Lorain (disambiguation)
- Loraine (disambiguation)
- Lorane (disambiguation)
- Lorrain (disambiguation)
