= Loraine =

Loraine may refer to:

== People ==
- Loraine (name)

== Places ==
- Loraine, California
- Loraine, Illinois
- Loraine, North Dakota
- Loraine, Texas
- Loraine Township, Henry County, Illinois

== Buildings ==
- Hotel Loraine, Wisconsin, United States
- Loraine Building, Michigan, United States

== Other uses ==
- Loraine, a song by Linton Kwesi Johnson from the album Bass Culture
- Loraine baronets, English baronetage

== See also ==
- Lorain (disambiguation)
- Lorane (disambiguation)
- Lorrain (disambiguation)
- Lorraine (disambiguation)
- Lorraine (given name)
