= Lorena (name) =

- Pronunciation: Lor ay na, or Lor é na
- Gender: Female

Origin
- Origin: Latinized form of "Lauren"
- Meaning: Laurel wreath-crowned
- Region of origin: Spain, Portugal, England, Brazil, Italy

Lorena is a German, English, Croatian, Italian, Portuguese and Spanish feminine given name with different origins. It can be used as a version of Lorraine or, alternately, as a Latin version of Lauren. As a Croatian, Italian, Portuguese and Spanish name, it is derived from the Latin Laurentius. As a German and English name, it is a modern form of the Germanic Chlothar (which is a blended form of Hlūdaz and Harjaz). As used in the United States, it may have come from the song title of a popular 1856 song by Rev. Henry D.L. Webster and Joseph Philbrick Webster, who are said to have derived the name from an anagram of the name Lenore, a character in Edgar Allan Poe's 1845 poem The Raven. In Margaret Mitchell's 1936 novel Gone with the Wind, Scarlett O'Hara's daughter with Frank Kennedy was named Ella Lorena in reference to the song Lorena. Frank G. Slaughter wrote a book called Lorena in which the character was also called Reeny hence the alternative pronunciation of Lor ee na.

== People ==
- Lorena Azzaro (born 2000), French footballer
- Lorena Baumann (born 1997), Swiss footballer
- Lorena Berdún (born 1963), Spanish sexologist
- Lorena Bernal (born 1977), Argentine model and former Miss Spain
- Lorena Betts, Brazilian-American nurse and politician
- Lorena Blanco (born 1977), Peruvian badminton player
- Lorena Bobbitt (born 1970), former wife of John Wayne Bobbitt
- Lorena Briceño (born 1978), Argentine judoka
- Lorena David, American filmmaker
- Lorena Delgado Varas (born 1974), Swedish politician
- Lorena Feijóo (born 1970 or 1971), Cuban ballet dancer
- Lorena Fries (born 1960), Chilean politician
- Lorena Gale (1958–2009), Canadian actress
- Lorena (singer) (born 1986), Spanish singer, born Lorena Gómez Pérez
- Lorena González Dios (born 1988), Spanish politician
- Lorena Guerra (born 1988), Spanish politician
- Lorena Herrera (born 1967), Mexican actress
- Lorena Hickok (1893–1968), American journalist and friend (and possibly lover) of Eleanor Roosevelt
- Lorena Improta (born 1993), Brazilian dancer, singer, presenter and businesswoman
- Lorena Klijn (born 1987), Dutch kickboxer
- Lorena Kloosterboer (born 1962), Dutch Argentine artist and author
- Lorena Mirambell (1935–2025), Mexican archaeologist
- Lorena Nosić, Croatian voice actress
- Lorena Ochoa (born 1981), Mexican golfer
- Lorena Pizarro (born 1966), Chilean politician
- Lorena Pokoik (born 1972), Argentine politician
- Lorena Rojas (born 1972), Mexican actress and singer
- Lorena Velázquez (1939–2024), Mexican actress
- Lorena Zaffalon (born 1981), Italian synchronised swimmer

== Fictional characters ==
- Lorena Krasiki, in the Southern Vampire Mysteries series and True Blood television show
- Lorena Marquez, in DC Comics
- Lorena Wood Parker, in the Lonesome Dove series
- Lorena, in Mi familia es un dibujo
