= Lorrayne =

Lorrayne or Lorayne may refer to:

- Harry Lorayne (born Harry Ratzer, 1926–2023), American mnemonist, magician and author
- Vyvyan Lorrayne (1939–2022), South African ballet dancer
- Lorrayne Gracie (born 1964), British tennis player

== See also ==
- Lorraine (given name)
- Lorraine (surname)
