= Raini =

Raini may refer to:

- Raini Rodriguez (born 1993), an American actress and singer
- Lorraine (given name)
- Loraine (name)
- Taranagar, a city and a municipality in India
- Raini, Chamoli, a village in India, effected by the 2021 Uttarakhand flood

== See also ==
- Rainis, the pseudonym of Jānis Pliekšāns (1865–1929), a Latvian poet, playwright, translator, and politician
- Rainie (disambiguation)
- Reni (disambiguation)
- Rini (disambiguation)
