= Lorraine (surname) =

Lorraine is the surname of:

- Alys Lorraine (1885-1956), American operatic soprano
- Andrew Lorraine (born 1972), American retired Major League Baseball pitcher
- Ed Lorraine (1928–2008), Canadian politician
- Guido Lorraine (1912–2009), Polish-born actor, musician and singer
- Harry Lorraine (American actor)
- Harry Lorraine (English actor) (1886–1934), English silent film actor
- Kay Lorraine, American former singer
- Lillian Lorraine (1892–1955), American stage and screen actress
- Louise Lorraine (1901–1981), American film actress
- Marie Lorraine (1899–1982), stage name of Australian actress Isabella Mercia McDonagh

== See also ==
- Lorraine (disambiguation)
- Lorraine (given name)
- Loraine (name)
