= Loraine (name) =

Loraine is a feminine given name that is a modern form of the Germanic Chlothar (which is a blended form of Hlūdaz and Harjaz). It is a name that originates from the French region of Lorraine. Notable people known by this name include the following:

== Given name ==
- Loraine Baricchi, half of the Luca and Loraine Baricchi ballroom dance pair
- Loraine Barry (born 1964), Irish dancer
- Loraine Boettner (1901–1990), American theologian and author
- Loraine Braham (1938–2026), Australian politician
- Loraine Despres, American novelist and screenwriter
- Loraine Gonzales (born 1977), American wheelchair basketball player
- Loraine Hutchins (1948–2025), American author, activist and sex educator
- Loraine Immen (1840–1927), American philanthropist, elocutionist and club leader
- Loraine Mellor, British Methodist minister
- Loraine Obler, American neuroscientist
- Loraine Seville, known by the stage name Raine Seville (born 1986), Jamaican dancehall and reggae artist
- Loraine Bedsole Bush Tunstall (1879–1953), American child welfare advocate
- Loraine Victor (born 1948), South African lawn bowler
- Loraine Wyman (1885–1937), American soprano

== Surname ==
- Eustace Loraine (1879–1912), British aviation pioneer
- John Alexander Loraine (1924–1988), Scottish physician and endocrinologist
- Sir Lambton Loraine, 11th Baronet (1838–1917), British naval officer
- Percy Loraine, whose full name is Sir Percy Loraine, 12th Baronet (1880–1961), British diplomat
- Philip Loraine, a pen name of Robin Estridge (1920–2002), British author
- Robert Loraine (1876–1935), London and Broadway stage actor, actor-manager and soldier, later a pioneer aviator
- Violet Loraine (1886–1956), English musical theatre actress and singer

== See also ==
- Loraine (disambiguation)
- Harry Lorayne (1926–2023), American mnemonist, magician and author born Harry Ratzer
- Helen M. McLoraine
- Lorraine (given name)
- Lorraine (surname)
- Rainie (disambiguation)
