= Reni =

Reni may refer to:

== Places ==
- Reni, Alwar, Alwar district, Rajasthan, India
- Reni, Chamoli (also Raini), Chamoli district, Uttarakhand, India, devastated by the 2021 Uttarakhand flood
- Reni, Churu, Churu district, Rajasthan, India
- Reni, Ukraine, a city in Odesa Oblast (southern Ukraine) on the border with Romania, near the confluence of Prut and Danube rivers
- Reni Raion, a former subdivision of Ukraine
- Reni (island), in West Papua, Indonesia

== People ==
- Reni (musician) (born 1964), English musician
- Guido Reni (1575–1642), Italian painter
- Reni Erkens (1909–1987), German freestyle swimmer
- Reni Jusis (born 1974), Polish pop singer, songwriter and producer
- Reni Lane (born 1988), American singer-songwriter
- Reni Maitua (born 1982), Australian rugby league footballer
- Reni Masi (1933–2020), Canadian politician
- Reni Santoni (1939–2020), American actor
- Reni Takagi (born 1993), Japanese singer
- Reni Yordanova (born 1953), Bulgarian rower

== See also ==
- René
- Rini (disambiguation)
- Raini (disambiguation)
