= Rini =

Rini may refer to:

== Places ==
- Rini, Uttarakhand, India, a village known for the 2021 glacier flood disaster
- Rini and Rhini, transliterations of the Xhosa name of Makhanda (formerly Grahamstown), South Africa

== People ==
=== Given name ===
- Rini Budiarti (born 1983), Indonesian long-distance runner
- Rini Simon Khanna (born 1964), Indian television news anchor
- Rini Mulder (1953–2007), killed by police in Utrecht, Netherlands
- Rini Raj (born 1999), Indian actress
- Rini Soemarno (born 1958), Indonesian economist and politician
- Rini van Woerden (1934–2004), Dutch footballer
- Rini Widyantini (born 1965), Indonesian politician, Minister of Administrative and Bureaucratic Reform
- Rini Wulandari (born 1984), Indonesian pop singer

=== Nickname or pseudonym ===
- Rini Bell (born 1981), American actress
- Rini Coolen (born 1967), Dutch retired football defender and manager
- Rini Dobber (born 1943), Dutch retired swimmer
- Rini Price (1941–2019), American painter and visual artist born Nancy Rini
- Rini Templeton (1935–1986), American graphic artist, sculptor, and political activist
- Rini Wagtmans (born 1946), Dutch former road bicycle racer

=== Surname ===
- Adriane Rini, American professor of philosophy
- Marco Martina Rini (born 1990), Italian footballer
- Mary Rini (1925–2019), American baseball pitcher
- Paige Rini (born 2000), Canadian water skier
- Snyder Rini (1948–2025), Solomon Islands politician

== Fictional characters ==
- Chibiusa, renamed Rini in some English adaptations, a Sailor Moon manga character

== See also ==
- Riny Kuijf (born 1960), Dutch chess International Master
- Reni (disambiguation)
- Raini (disambiguation)
