= Kliese Housebarn =

Historic house in Wisconsin, United States

- U.S. National Register of Historic Places
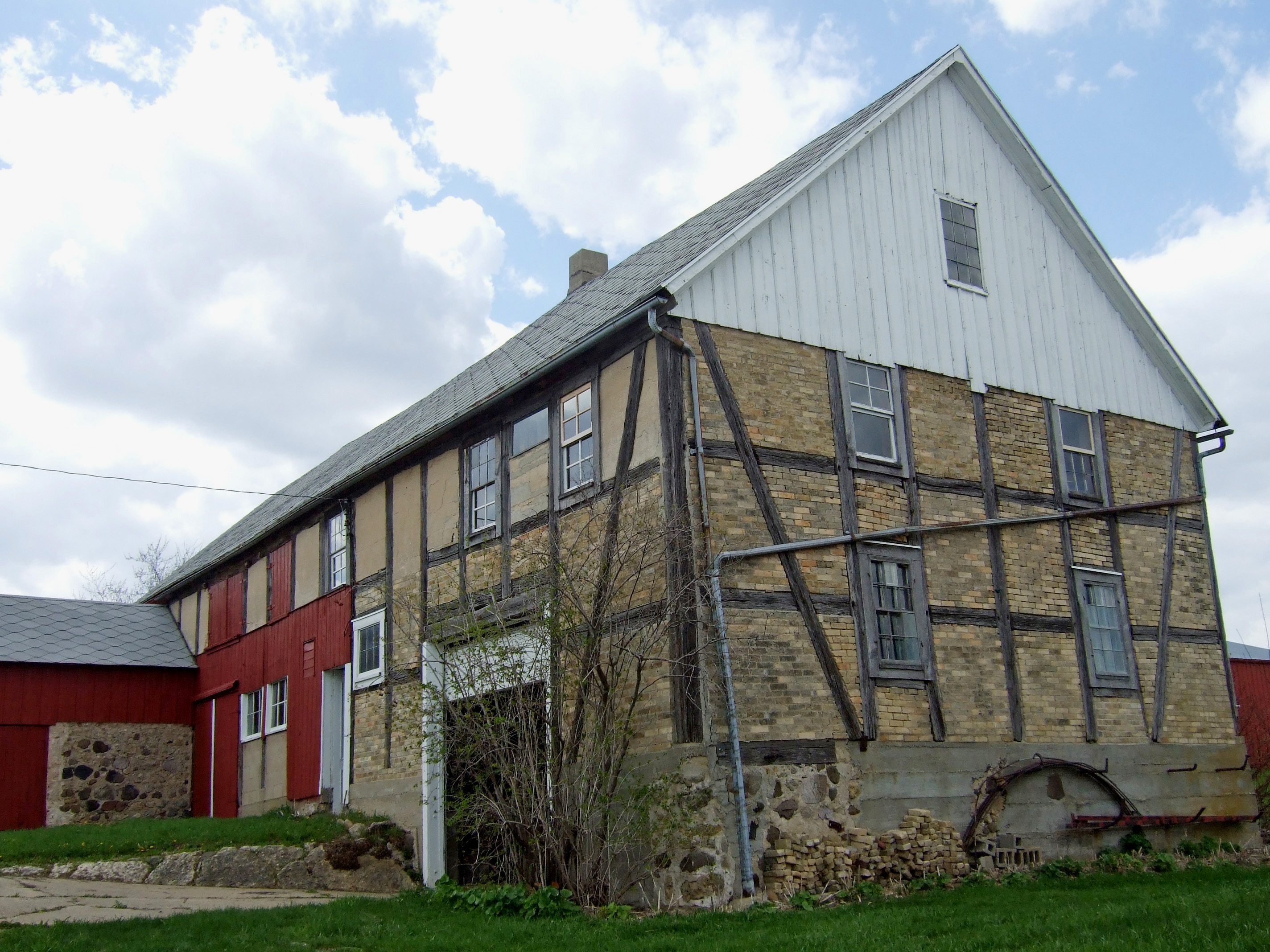
- Location: N366 County Road EM; Emmet, Wisconsin
- Coordinates: 43.20669°N 88.66778°W
- Built: circa 1850
- Architectural style: Mid-19th Century
- NRHP reference No.: 08000257
- Added to NRHP: April 2, 2008

The Kliese Housebarn, also known as the Langhoff Housebarn, is a historic Housebarn located in Emmet, Wisconsin. It was added to the National Register of Historic Places in 2008.

== Architecture ==
This house is a traditional housebarn of the German half-timbered style. One side of the building was used as a barn, while the other side was used for human habitation. It was also used to store and process crops. The house also contained a traditional German schwarz küche that was used to smoke and cure meat.
