= Lorraine (given name) =

- Gender: Female

Origin
- Origin: from Medieval Latin Lotharingia, "Lothar's realm"

Other names
- Alternative spelling: Loraine, Lorayne
- Nicknames: Lori/Lorri(e), Raine(y), Reina
- Related names: Laura; Laurène; Lareine; Lauren; Laraine; Lorene; Lorinne; Lorena

Lorraine is a feminine given name derived from the region of Lorraine in France. It has been used in the English-speaking world (especially the United States and Canada) since the Franco-Prussian War, during which events brought the region to the North American public's attention. It is a Danish, English, Finnish, Norwegian, and Swedish modern form of the Germanic name Chlothar (which is a blended form of Hlūdaz and Harjaz).

== People ==
- Lorraine Bracco (born 1954), American actress
- Lorraine Broderick (born 1948), American television soap opera writer
- Lorraine Chase (born 1951), English actress and model
- Lorraine Cheshire (1960–2025), English actress
- Lorraine Cole (born 1967), English badminton player and Coach
- Lorraine Collett (1892–1983), American model
- Lorraine Dunn (1942–2003), Panamanian sprinter and hurdler
- Lorraine Eckardt (1914–1991), American composer
- Lorraine Ellison (1931–1983), American soul singer
- Lorraine Fenton (born 1973), Jamaican athlete
- Lorraine Hansberry (1930–1965), American playwright
- Lorraine Hunt Lieberson (1954–2006), American mezzo-soprano
- Lorraine Kelly (born 1959), Scottish broadcaster
- Lorraine Landon (born 1947), Australian basketball administrator and former player and coach
- Lorraine Malach (1933–2003), Canadian artist
- Lorraine McIntosh (born 1964), female vocalist, with the Scottish pop band, Deacon Blue
- Lorraine McNamara (born 1999), American ice dancer
- Lorraine Nicholson (born 1990), American actress
- Lorraine O'Grady (1934–2024), American conceptual artist
- Lorraine Pascale (born 1972), British model and TV chef
- Lorraine Pearson (born 1967), English vocalist, formerly with the band Five Star
- Lorraine Segato (born 1956), Canadian pop singer-songwriter
- Lorraine Stefani, British higher education academic
- Lorraine Thorpe (born 1994), British convicted murderer
- Lorraine Warren (1927–2019), American paranormal investigator

== Fictional characters ==
- Lorraine Baines McFly, the mother of Marty McFly in the Back to the Future film trilogy
- Lorraine Baker, the third daughter in the Baker family in the film Cheaper by the Dozen
- Lorraine Reilly (Firehawk), a character in the DC Comics universe
- Lorraine Wicks, in the British soap opera EastEnders

== See also ==
- Lorraine (disambiguation)
- Lorraine (surname)
- Loraine (name)
- Lorraine (disambiguation)
- Lorrain (disambiguation)
- Rainie (disambiguation)
- House of Lorraine
- Cross of Lorraine
- Harry Lorayne
