= Lorain =

Lorain may refer to:

== Places ==
- Lorain, Ohio
- Lorain, Pennsylvania
- Lorain, Wisconsin
- Lorain County, Ohio
  - Lorain County Community College
- Lorain Township, Minnesota

== People ==
- René Lorain (born 1900), French athlete
- Sophie Lorain, Canadian actress

== Organizations ==
- Lorain City School District
- Lorain Correctional Institution
- Lorain County Transit
- Lorain, Ashland & Southern Railroad

== Other uses ==
- Milkovich v. Lorain Journal Co.
- USS Lorain (PF-93)

== See also ==
- Loraine (disambiguation)
- Lorrain (disambiguation)
- Lorraine (disambiguation)
