= Lorraine Stefani =

British professor of higher education

- Born: 1953 (age 72–73)

Academic background
- Education: University of Aberdeen, University of Glasgow, University College London
- Thesis: Mapping the transcriptional unit of the human epsilon globin gene (1982)

Lorraine Anne Jennifer Stefani (born 1953) is a British academic and author, and is emeritus professor of higher education at the University of Auckland. Stefani has edited several books on higher education leadership and practice, and is president of the International Higher Education Teaching and Learning Association.

== Academic career ==
Stefani originally trained as a scientist, and earned a Bachelor of Science with Honours at the University of Aberdeen, and then completed a PhD titled Mapping the transcriptional unit of the human epsilon globin gene at the University of Glasgow in 1982. She also holds a postgraduate diploma in education and social work from University College London. Stefani was a Reader at the Centre for Academic Practice at the University of Strathclyde, and then joined the faculty of the University of Auckland in 2003, where she was Director of Academic Development. She was appointed full professor ten years later. Stefani retired from the university in 2017 and was awarded the title of emeritus professor. She is President of the International Higher Education Teaching and Learning Association (known as HETL), was an inaugural board member of Ako Aotearoa (the NZ National Centre for Tertiary Teaching Excellence) and has consulted internationally on education development.

Stefani is interested in the leadership models of complex organisations, and how leadership in education is developed. She has written or edited several books, with subjects including the educational potential of e-portfolios, inclusive leadership in higher education, and the evaluation of effective academic development. She also evaluated the University of Auckland's long-running Women in Leadership course.

== Selected works ==
=== Books ===
- Stefani, Lorraine; Blessinger, Patrick, eds. (7 August 2017). Inclusive Leadership in Higher Education: International Perspectives and Approaches. Routledge. p. 236. ISBN 9781138201446.
- Stefani, Lorraine, ed. (30 August 2010). Evaluating the Effectiveness of Academic Development: Principles and Practice. Routledge. p. 256. ISBN 9780415872072.
- Stefani, Lorraine; Mason, Robin; Pegler, Chris (26 April 2007). The educational potential of e-portfolios:Supporting personal development and reflective learning. London: Routledge. doi:10.4324/9780203961292. ISBN 9780203961292.
- Stefani, Lorraine. Effective Use of IT:Guidance on practice in the biosciences (Teaching Bioscience Enhancing Learning). Centre for Bioscience. ISBN 978-0954875114.

=== Journal articles ===
- Stefani, Lorraine (2011). "Reviewer Essay: What Makes for a High Quality IJ-SoTL Research Article?". International Journal for the Scholarship of Teaching and Learning. 5 (1). doi:10.20429/ijsotl.2011.050136. Wikidata Q130413810.
- Stefani, Lorraine (2011). "Current Perspectives on SOTL". International Journal for the Scholarship of Teaching and Learning (in French). 5 (1). doi:10.20429/ijsotl.2011.050102. Wikidata Q130413809.
- Stefani, Lorraine (1998). "Assessment in Partnership with Learners". Assessment and Evaluation in Higher Education. 23 (4): 339–350. doi:10.1080/0260293980230402. Wikidata Q130413808.
- Veronica Bamber; Stefani, Lorraine (2015). "Taking up the challenge of evidencing value in educational development: from theory to practice". International Journal for Academic Development. 21 (3): 242–254. doi:10.1080/1360144x.2015.1100112. Wikidata Q130413857.
- Lorraine Stefani (2013). "Performance measurement for academic development: risk or opportunity?". International Journal for Academic Development. 18 (3): 294–296. doi:10.1080/1360144x.2013.818542. Wikidata Q130413858.
- Stefani, Lorraine; Joe Clarke; Littlejohn, Allison H. (2000). "Developing a Student-Centred Approach to Reflective Learning". Innovations in Education and Teaching International. 37 (2): 163–171. doi:10.1080/13558000050034529. Wikidata Q84946742.
- Stefani, Lorraine; Vicki N. Tariq (1996). "Running group practical projects for first-year undergraduate students". Journal of Biological Education. 30 (1): 36–44. doi:10.1080/00219266.1996.9655475. Wikidata Q130413869.
