= Alex Seitaniemi Housebarn =

Historic house in Minnesota, United States

- U.S. National Register of Historic Places
- Alex Seitaniemi Housebarn in 2026

- Location within Minnesota Location within the United States
- Location: 8162 Comet Road, Waasa Township, Minnesota
- Coordinates: 47°42′25.3″N 92°8′16″W
- Area: Less than one acre
- Built: c. 1907–c. 1913
- Architect: Alex Seitaniemi
- Architectural style: Log
- MPS: Rural Finnish Log Buildings of St. Louis County, Minnesota, 1890–1930s MPS
- NRHP reference No.: 90000771
- Added to NRHP: April 9, 1990

The Alex Seitaniemi Housebarn is a rare surviving example of a log housebarn constructed by Finnish Americans, located in Waasa Township, Minnesota, United States. It was built in two stages from about 1907 to about 1913. The housebarn was listed on the National Register of Historic Places in 1990 for its national significance in the themes of architecture and European ethnic heritage. It was nominated for being an example of a rare building type and for embodying the settlement and traditional log architecture of rural St. Louis County's Finnish American farmers.

The Seitaniemi Housebarn is owned and maintained by SISU Heritage Inc., a non-profit organization based in nearby Embarrass, Minnesota. It is a primary stop on the Finnish-American Homestead Tours offered in summers through the Embarrass Information Center.

== Earliest history ==
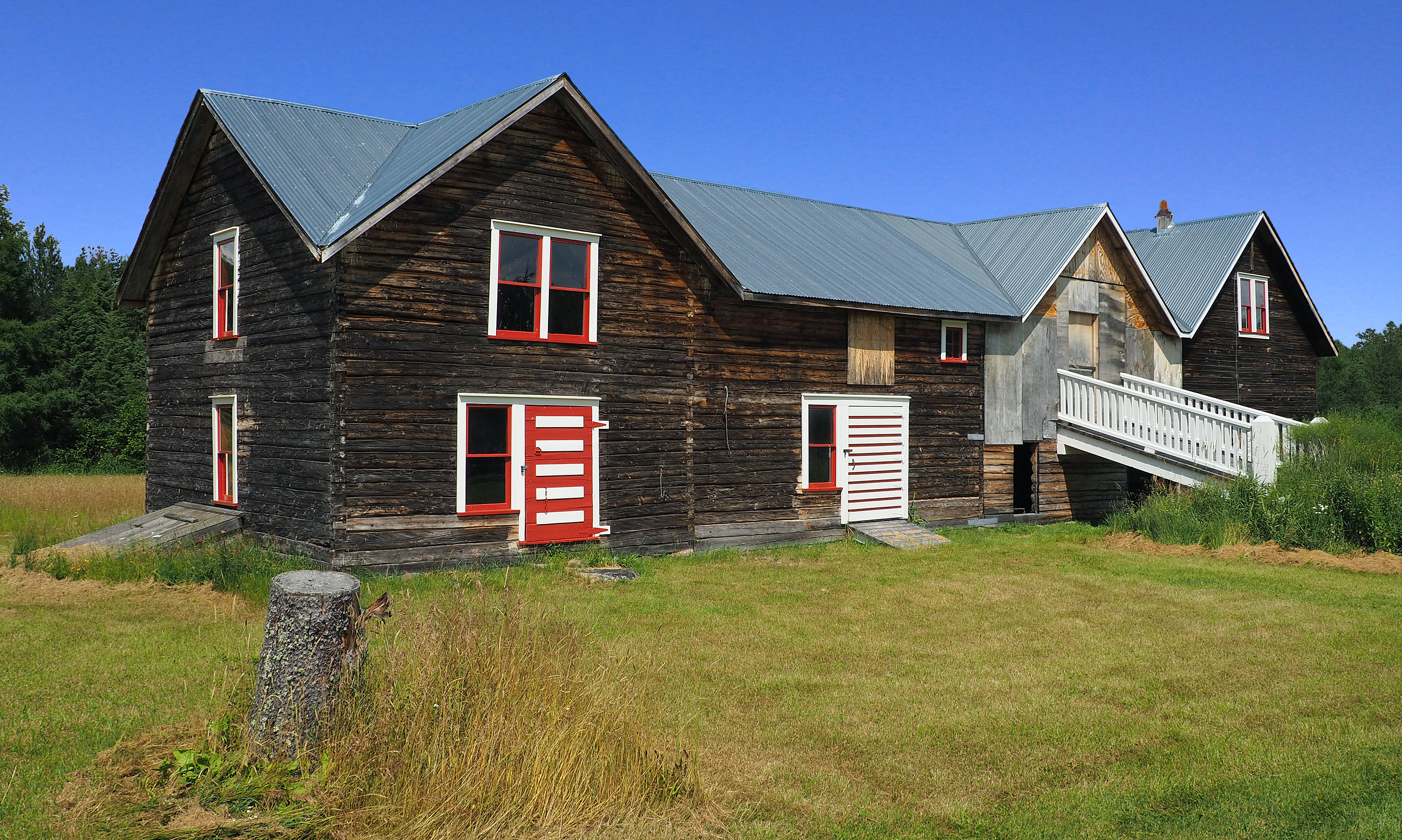
The Alex Seitaniemi Housebarn from the southwest before restoration

The builder, Alex Seitaniemi, was an emigrant from Sodankylä, a small village in northern Finland. He worked in Ely, Minnesota, and later bought a parcel of land of 80 acres (32 ha). He built the housebarn in two stages from 1907 through 1913, with a two-story living quarters and the horse barn. The farm produced hay, oats, and potatoes, and they also kept dairy cows until some time after World War II, when the U.S. Department of Agriculture mandated the use of concrete floors in dairy barns for sanitary reasons.

== Seitaniemi Family ==
Seitaniemi and his wife had a daughter and two sons, Bill and Knute. Bill and Knute never married. Knute lived in the house until he died in his 50s or 60s, while Bill lived in the house until the late 1990s.

== Construction ==
Seitaniemi built the housebarn in two stages from 1907 through 1913, with a two-story living quarters and the horse barn. Combining the house and barn in one building provided advantages. The heat from livestock kept the house warm, and constructing one building instead of several separate buildings conserved timber and the need to move it. The compact design also leaves more room available for farming and grazing.

== New owners ==
The property was bought by Carol and Larry Schaefer of Ely, who were interested in the land for hunting. As they got to know the history of the housebarn, they became interested in seeing its restoration. They donated the housebarn to Sisu Heritage, a local organization that provides tours of buildings and homesteads in the area. Sisu Heritage received a $60,500 grant from the Minnesota Historical and Cultural Grants program to stabilize the structure. One of the unusual aspects of the project involved stabilizing the foundation. Unlike many typical foundations, which go six feet (1.8 m) below ground level to avoid frost damage, the Seitaniemi building had footings of dry-stacked stone. This method allows the building to ride out frost heaves while still being locked together.

Upper level in barn

Upper level in barn

Upper level in house

Stables

== See also ==
- National Register of Historic Places listings in St. Louis County, Minnesota
