= Balaguer =

- Municipality
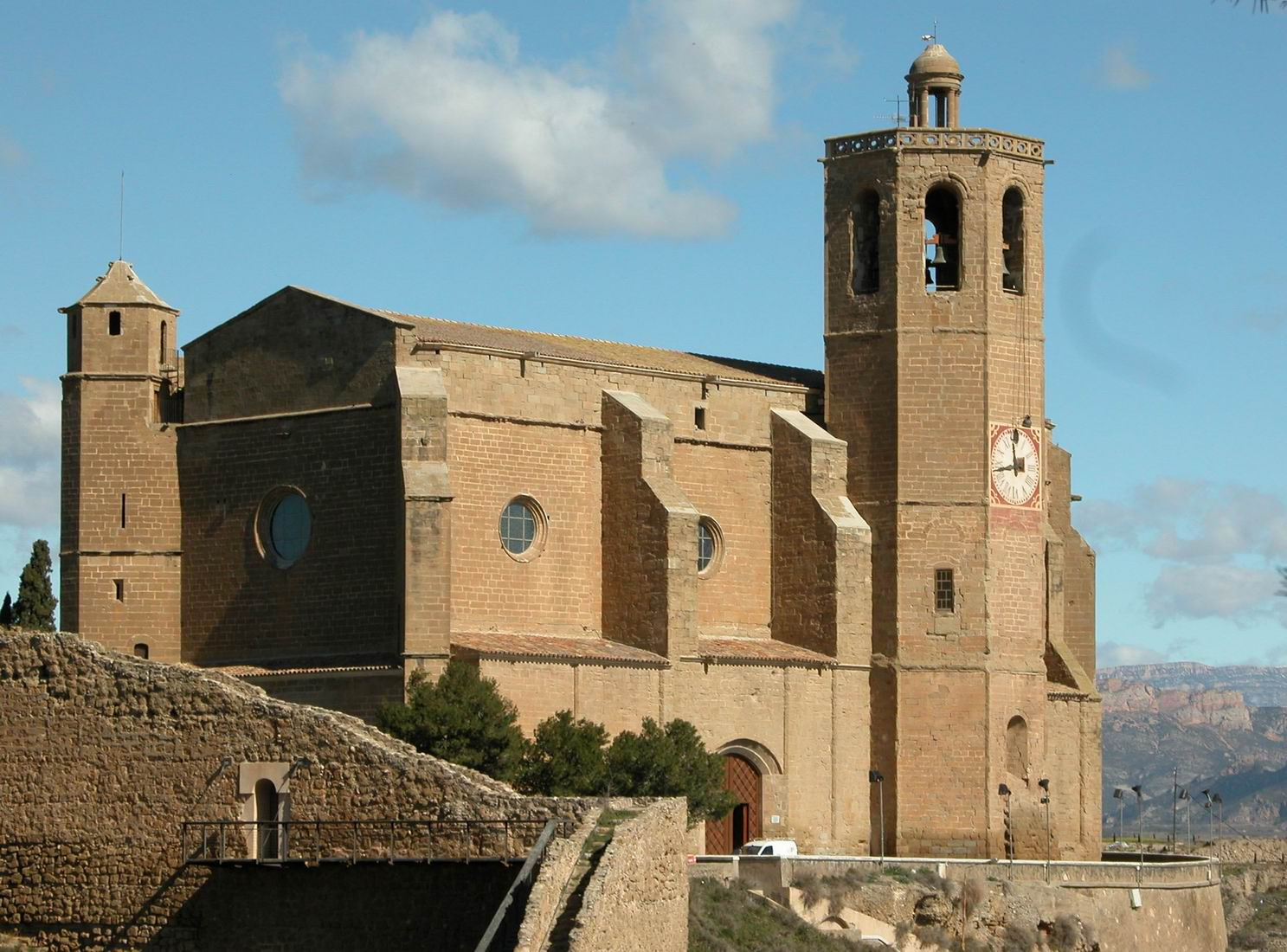
- Church of St. Mary.

- Flag Coat of arms

- Location in Catalonia Balaguer (Catalonia) Balaguer (Spain)
- Coordinates: 41.790°N 0.805°E
- Country: Spain
- Community: Catalonia
- Province: Lleida
- Comarca: La Noguera

Government
  - Mayor: Lorena González Dios (2023- )

Area
  - Total: 57.3 km^{2} (22.1 sq mi)
- Elevation: 233 m (764 ft)

Population (2025-01-01)
  - Total: 17,729
  - Density: 309/km^{2} (801/sq mi)
- Demonyms: Balaguerí, balaguerina
- Climate: Cfa
- Website: www.balaguer.cat

Balaguer (Catalan pronunciation: [balaˈɣe]) is the capital of the comarca of Noguera, in the province of Lleida, Catalonia, Spain. It is located by the river Segre, a tributary to the Ebro. The municipality includes an exclave to the east. Balaguer also has a sister city in the western United States, Pacifica, California. It has a population of 17,729 (register office, 2025).

Balaguer was conquered from the Moors by Ermengol VI of Urgell in 1106; he made it his new capital, and it remained so for subsequent counts of Urgell.

A Jewish community existed in Balaguer from the 11th century to the expulsion of the Jews in 1492.

The town has a Gothic bridge, the "Pont de Sant Miquel", over the Segre river. This bridge was destroyed during the Spanish Civil War in the battle of "Cap de Pont" when Francisco Franco's forces first entered Catalonia from Aragon in 1938 through Balaguer's bridgehead. The historic town is on the right bank of the Segre but, following the war, construction began on a modern bridge, which initiated development of a modern extension of the town on the left bank.

Another Gothic building is the Santa Maria Church, in the heights above the city, in line with a quite finely conserved wall dating to the 15th century AD.

The historic mansion Palauet de la muralla de Balaguer, converted to a hotel, is located in the city center and part of the old city wall forms the back of the building.

== Culture ==
=== Music ===
- Hot Numbers (1996), a musical fusion band

== Notable natives ==
- Josep Ivan Argelaga, performance artists "dogman"
- Gaspar de Portolà, founder of San Diego (United States) and Monterey (United States).
- Peter IV of Aragon, King of the Crown of Aragon.
- Antoni Torres García, footballer
- Xavier Sánchez Bernat, basketball player
- Roberto Martínez, former footballer and football manager.
- Teresa Pàmies, writer, political activist and mother of Sergi Pàmies.
- Felipe Cardeña, artist
- Josep Pàmies, pagès, entrepreneur and activist
- James II, Count of Urgell, royal Count

== See also ==
- Lord of Balaguer
- Balaguer Offensive
