= Hot Numbers =

Spanish band

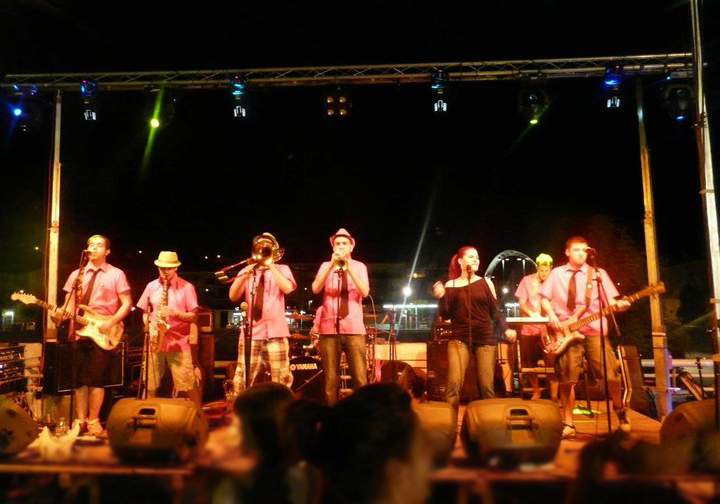
- Hot Numbers concert in their hometown, Balaguer (Spain)

Background information
- Origin: Balaguer, Lleida, (Spain)
- Genres: Ska, reggae, punk, rock
- Years active: 1995-present
- Labels: Shimauma
- Members: Anna Roset (main vocal); Orix Morelló (bass & vocals); Edu Torres (guitar); Marc Pinilla (trumpet); Jordi Amoros (trombone); David Ferrer (saxophone); Txer (drums); Dani Paniagua (keys)
- Website: www.telefonica.net/web2/dni/

Hot Numbers is a band formed in Spain, in 1995. The band's music fuses the musical genres of ska, reggae, punk, and various types of rock.

== History ==
Hot Numbers was formed by a group of friends who enjoyed Caribbean rhythms such as ska, reggae, and calypso. Their idea to compose and write music began as a hobby and later turned into a profession.

The group started in the world of entertainment in 1996.

The band's first concerts included "Rosaleda" and "Dr. Martens First International Ska Festival”. Hot Numbers played in Balaguer (their hometown), where they performed alongside other musical groups such as The Malarians and Skatalites.

In 2000, the lead singer decided to leave the band, but returned months later. Hot Numbers then re-entered mainstream music with new songs. They performed in concerts such as "Festimal" and "Fino's Reggae".

In 2002, the lead singer permanently quit the band again. The band continued, holding concerts and performing at festivals such as "Arritmia".

In 2008, Hot Numbers held the Girats '08 tour. They performed mainly in Spain, in cities such as Barcelona, Terrassa, and Madrid.

The band continued their tour through Spain in 2009, visiting Tàrrega, Balaguer, Miralcamp, and other cities.

In 2009, the band decided to record more professional-sounding music.

With the help of a new producer, they recorded their album "No ha costat tant...!" in the El Tostadero studio. They then came out with their first CD, released under the label Shimauma Records, in Barcelona.

The album contains 11 multilingual tracks, where the band invested time, experience, miles, and a part of themselves. With many influence from rock, punk, pop, and especially ska music, the album is danceable, fast, meaningful, and above all, full of hope.

In 2010, they performed their album "No ha costat tant...!" in Linyola, Lleida, Sant Martí de Maldà, Balaguer, and Santa Coloma de Queralt.

Hot Numbers has shared the stage with bands like Discípulos de Otilia, Color Humano, La Thorpe Brass, Potato, Komando Moriles, Bad Manners, Skaparàpid, Dr. Calypso, The Kluba, Kayo Malayo, La Pegatina, Melendi, Els Pets and El Gitano de Balaguer.

The group is influenced by ska and modern Californian bands like Reel Big Fish and Save Ferris, of whom they regularly cover.

Hot Numbers’ current band numbers include Anna Roset (main vocal), Orix Morelló (bass & vocals), Skaro Clotet (guitar & vocals), Rays Llavall (trumpet), Sisco Casals (trombone & vocals), Oriolet Puig (alto & baritone saxophone), Xesco Sauret (drums), and Dani Paniagua (keys).

== Discography ==
- No ha costat tant...! (Shimauma Records, 2010)
