= Rainie =

Rainie may refer to:

- Rainie Yang (Chinese: 楊丞琳; born 1984), a Taiwanese singer, actress and television host
- Robert Rainie (1860–1945), a Scottish rugby union player
- Lorraine "Rainie" Highway, a fictional character from the BBC One soap opera EastEnders
- Lorraine (given name)
- Loraine (name)

== See also ==
- Raini (disambiguation)
