= Palauet de la muralla de Balaguer =

Coordinates: 41.7890°N 0.8058°E

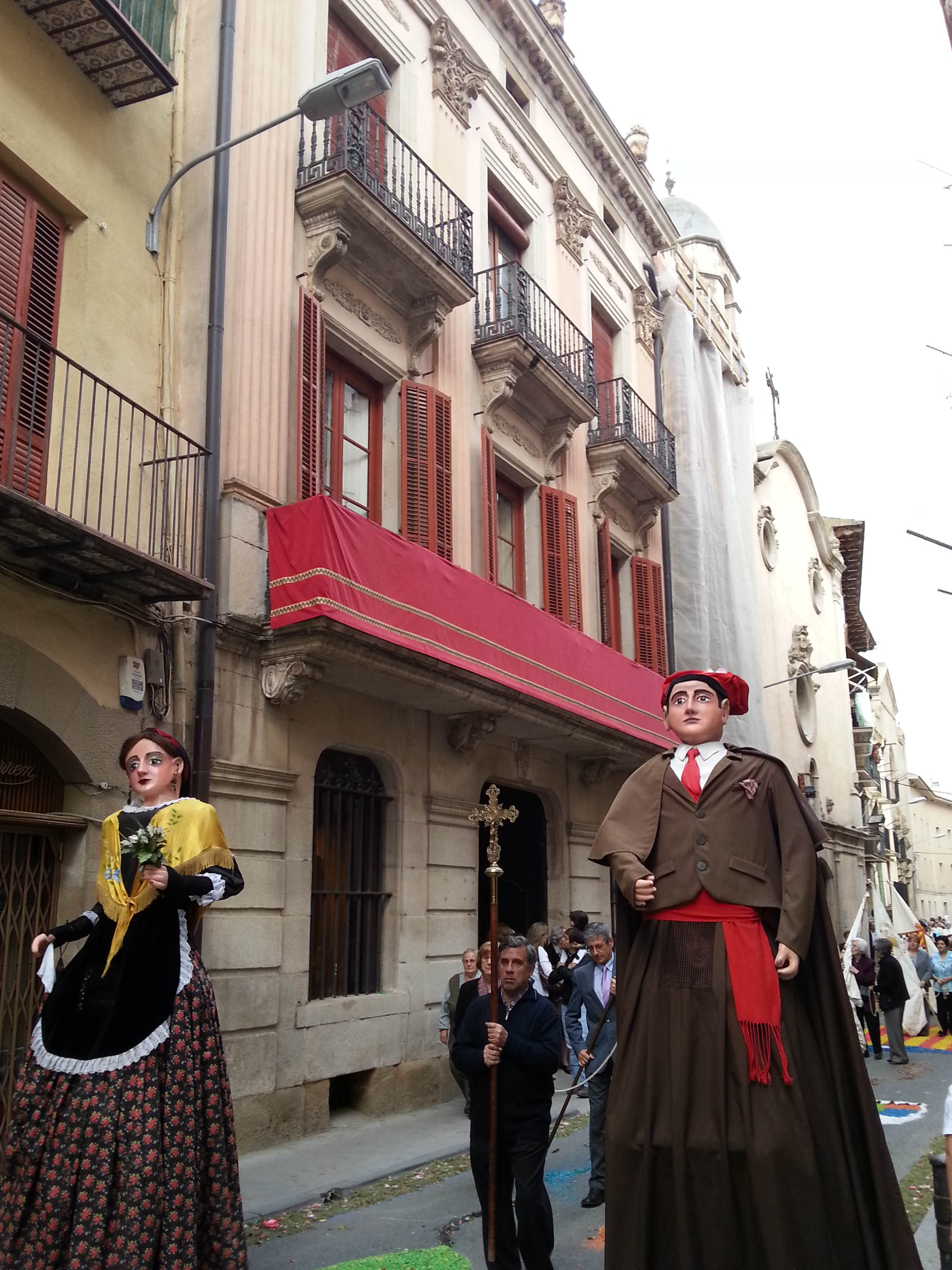
The Manor House's front wall

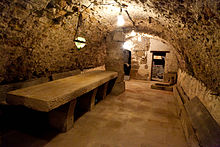
Cellar at the jewish part of the house

Lo Palauet de la Muralla is an old mansion, turned into a hotel, which is located in the historic center of the town of Balaguer (Noguera), in the old Jewish quarter. Located near Plaça Mercadal, its main facade faces Miracle Street, where the adjoining house separates it from the Church of Sant Joseph, which was a synagogue in the past. The back of the house, a part of the old city wall, faces the Segre river. Can Tarragona shares the city wall passage with the neighboring houses.

== Description ==
In the last fifty years the house has undergone a careful restoration and decoration with furniture and pieces acquired from antiques or purchased from churches of the region in ruins, thus preventing their disappearance.

The house retains its native structure and distribution. The basement, of Jewish origin as reflected in the water pipes, contains the "cellar", with two wells or reservoirs that were probably used for conservation of oil and other products, and the stable. There is also a passage, now walled up, which communicates with the Church of Sant Joseph. In one of the rooms in the basement there is also a massive stone table in one piece. The courtyard stands out at the back of the house, bounded by the thick stone walls of the building and the wall, and through which the visitor reaches a space, known as "lo Portalet", that overlooks the river.

Accessing the house through the main entrance, the visitor finds himself in a large hall with stone slabs covering the ground and monastic stalls. A first flight of stairs leads to a spacious game room. Continuing the ascent, now through a covered patio, you get to the first floor, where the main suites of the hotel are. The ceilings’ original paintings as well as moldings and coffered ceilings have been recovered, thanks to the intervention of master craftsmen such as the carpenter Ton Camarasa and the painter Àngel Soldevila. Mosaics and original wooden floors of the various rooms have also been preserved. Foremost among them, the main room, with a mirror by Murano, the dining room with its fireplace of solid wood, or the library, with over a thousand volumes, many of them bound in parchment, from the Franciscan convent of Sant Domènec. The bedrooms are furnished in imperial and Venetian style.

On the second floor, there are six suites, some of which have access to a terrace overlooking the river. It is a vantage point not only of the river Segre pass through the city, but also of the Montsec mountains that can be seen in the distance. Finally, the attic, located on the third floor and known in the region as "lo Perche”, with original wooden beams at sight and old floor tiles, offers the possibility of recreating an isolated and cozy past.

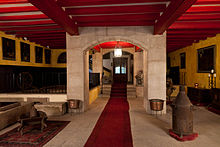
Main entrance

== History ==
The manor house has its origins in the expulsion of the Jews from the former town of Balaguer in 1333, and its relocation on the other side, which would later become Plaça Mercadal. The town market has been held there every Saturday for more than 800 years. The building has undergone several renovations and expansions to reach its current state. It is noteworthy that the Renaissance façade was built in the eighteenth century, giving the interior of the house its current structure.

In 1930, the Carmelite Sisters of Charity acquired the property to use it as a girls' school and convent, which they did until the late fifties. The books of the library, most of which are church books, lives of saints and sermons, come from the Franciscan convent of Sant Domènec de Balaguer. The books were saved from being burned during the Civil War because someone bricked the entrance to the library and thus avoided its devastation.
