= Lorane =

Lorane may refer to:

- Lorane, Georgia
- Lorane, Indiana
- Lorane, Oregon
- Lorane, Pennsylvania

== See also ==
- Lorraine (disambiguation)
