= Kay Lorraine =

American singer (1918–1979)

Kay Lorraine Grimm (29 May 1918-25 May 1979) was an American singer of the 1940s. Early in her career, she was billed as Lorraine Grimm.

== Early years ==
She was born on 29 May 1918. The daughter of Mr. and Mrs. E. J. Grimm of Webster Groves, Missouri, Lorraine attended Rosati-Kain High School in St. Louis. Her performing debut occurred as a member of the chorus with the St. Louis Municipal Opera when she was 7 years old.

== Career ==
At age 17 in December 1933, Lorraine (billed as Lorraine Grimm) was performing in the Club Lido in the Abe Lincoln Hotel in Springfield, Illinois. She turned down an offer for an extended stay because she had committed to sing with Art Lund and his orchestra for a New Year's Eve show in St. Louis. Their songs included "I Love You More Each Day", for which Lorraine wrote words and music. In January 1935, she began singing on radio station KSD in St. Louis, and by June 1935 she was providing "most of the entertainment" in the Hotel Gatesworth's Walnut Room in St. Louis. At that time she also sang (billed as Lorraine King), on St. Louis radio station KWK. In November 1936, Lorraine and Edith Karen joined organist Eddie Dunstedter and others on a weekly program that originated at KMOX. Phillips Poly Follies was carried on more than 30 CBS stations in the southwest and west, making it the most widely distributed network program to originate at KMOX up to that time. Lorraine also had the program Lyrics by Lorraine that originated on KMOX and was carried by a network. In 1939, after a radio programming executive heard her sing on KMOX, Lorraine was hired to perform on Your Hit Parade after executives on the program had rejected 207 vocalists who had auditioned for the job. She also was a featured singer on the network programs The Chamber Music Society of Lower Basin Street and Lavender and New Lace.

In 1942, Lorraine sang on an around-the-world broadcast of ceremonies commemorating the unveiling of the Statue of Liberty. She sang the Marsaillaise, while a French vocalist sand The Star Spangled Banner. In November 1945, she was the featured female singer on Songs of Good Cheer on KSD. The program also featured tenor Willard young and Jerry Sears and his orchestra. In 1954, she had her own program, The Kay Lorraine Show, on KSD.

Lorraine was so active on transcribed radio programs that a newspaper columnist labeled her "The Queen of Transcriptions". In 1947, Lorraine starred in The Kay Lorraine Show, a transcribed radio program produced by Harry S. Goodman. It was one of her five transcribed series that were broadcast on 500 radio stations.

Lorraine recorded "Hanging In the Hock Shop Window" backed with "Philomar" in 1944 on the Standard label. On film, she made the soundies "I Don't Want to Walk Without You" (1942) (Program 1063) and "The Kerry Dance" (1942), both with Merle Fitt and His Five Shades of Blue (Program 1066). Her work on films included being a ghost singer for Gloria Grahame on the song "Paradise" in the film A Woman's Secret (1949).

== Personal life ==
Lorraine was married to Raymond G. Sweeney, a newspaperman, and Lee Meyers, a radio publicist. She died on 25 May 1979.
