= Lorraine, Limpopo =

Lorraine
- Location within Limpopo Location within South Africa
- Coordinates: 24.194°S 30.424°E
- Country: South Africa
- Province: Limpopo
- District: Mopani
- Municipality: Maruleng

Area
  - Total: 4.90 km^{2} (1.89 sq mi)

Population (2001)
  - Total: 6,257
  - Density: 1,280/km^{2} (3,310/sq mi)
- Time zone: UTC+2 (SAST)
- Postal code (street): 0890
- PO box: n/a

Lorraine is a town in Mopani District Municipality in the Limpopo province of South Africa.

Another place named "Lorraine" in South Africa, is an old residential suburb of Port Elizabeth.
