= Allison Littlejohn =

English academic

Allison Littlejohn FHEA
- Littlejohn in 2020
- Education: University of Strathclyde (PhD)
- Scientific career
- Fields: Professional learning; Digital learning; AI in Education
- Workplaces: University College London; University of Glasgow; Open University; University of Dundee
- Thesis: A Comparative Examination of the Mechanical Properties of Sodium Nitrate and Calcite and the Influence of Defects On Their Reactivity (1988)
- Website: littlebylittlejohn.com

Allison Littlejohn, FHEA, is Professor of Learning Technology at University College London. She is a director of University College London's knowledge lab and an expert in learning sciences, specialising in professional and digital learning.

== Education ==
Littlejohn received her PhD from the University of Strathclyde in Chemistry in 1988. Her thesis was titled A Comparative Examination of the Mechanical Properties of Sodium Nitrate and Calcite and the Influence of Defects On Their Reactivity.

== Career and research ==
Littlejohn was appointed as Professor within the School of Education and Dean of Learning and Teaching at the College of Social Sciences at the University of Glasgow in April 2019. In November 2019 she was appointed director of University College London's knowledge lab.

=== Publications ===
She has published on open-access learning, digital resources, massive open online courses (MOOCs), and Wikipedia editing within education:

- Allison Littlejohn and Carol Higgison, A guide for teachers (York: Learning and Teaching Support Network (LTSN), 2003)
- Littlejohn, Allison; Pegler, Chris (2007). Preparing for Blended e-Learning. Abingdon, UK: Routledge. ISBN 978-0-415-40361-0 – via oro.open.ac.uk.
- Margaryan, Anoush; Littlejohn, Allison; Vojt, Gabrielle (2011). "Are digital natives a myth or reality? University students' use of digital technologies". Computers & Education. 56 (2): 429–440. doi:10.1016/j.compedu.2010.09.004. ISSN 0360-1315.
- Allison Littlejohnn and Anoush Margaryan, Technology-enhanced professional learning : processes, practices, and tools (New York: Routledge, 2013)
- Allison Littlejohn and Chris Pegler, Reusing open resources : learning in open networks for work, life and education (London: Routledge, 2015)
- Margaryan, Anoush; Bianco, Manuela; Littlejohn, Allison (2015). "Instructional quality of Massive Open Online Courses (MOOCs)" (PDF). Computers & Education. 80: 77–83. doi:10.1016/j.compedu.2014.08.005. ISSN 0360-1315.
- Victoria Murphy, Allison Littlejohn, Bart C. Rienties, (2020) 'Social network analysis and activity theory: A symbiotic relationship', Dominik E. Froehlich, Martin Rehm, and Bart C. Rienties (eds.) Mixed methods social network analysis: Theories and methodologies in learning and education (London, United Kingdom: Routledge) pp. 113–125
- Vasudha Chaudhari, Victoria Murphy, and Allison Littlejohn, (2020) 'The Educational Intelligent Economy – Lifelong Learning – A vision for the future', Tavis D. Jules, and Florin D. Salajan (eds.) The Educational Intelligent Economy: Artificial Intelligence, Machine Learning and the Internet of Things in Education. International Perspectives on Education and Society (In Press), 38. Emerald, pp. 109–126
- Berry, Leon; Rienties, Bart; Littlejohn, Allison; Sastry, Venkat (2020). "A quasi-experimental study to explore the impact of PAR on becoming an Agile Warrior" (PDF). Military Psychology. 32 (2): 198–211. doi:10.1080/08995605.2020.1724753. hdl:1826/15409. ISSN 0899-5605. PMC 10013489. PMID 38536346. S2CID 211566202.
- Varga-Atkins, T, Sharpe, R, Bennett, S, Alexander, S and Littlejohn. (2021). The choices that connect uncertainty and sustainability: Student-centred agile decision-making approaches used by universities in Australia and the UK during the COVID-19 pandemic. Journal of Interactive Media in Education, 1(16), pp. 1–16. DOI: https://doi.org/10.5334/jime.649
