= Lorena González Dios =

Spanish politician (born 1988)

Member of the Senate
- In office 14 May 2021 – 29 May 2023
- Appointed by: Parliament of Catalonia

Personal details
- Born: 14 March 1988 (age 38)
- Party: Socialists' Party of Catalonia

Lorena González Dios (born 14 March 1988) is a Spanish politician serving as mayor of Balaguer since 2023. From 2021 to 2023, she was a member of the Senate.
