= Lorrain =

Lorrain or Le Lorrain may refer to:

== People ==
- Claude Lorrain (1600–1682), French Baroque painter, draughtsman and etcher born Claude Gellée, called le Lorrain in French
- Dessamae Lorrain (1927–2011), American archaeologist
- James Herbert Lorrain (1870–1944), Scottish Baptist missionary in northeast India
- Mathilde Lorrain, birth name of Moufida Bourguiba (1890–1976), first wife of Habib Bourguiba, the first president of Tunisia
- Michèle Lorrain (born 1960), Canadian artist
- Paul Lorrain (died 1719), British prison chaplain
- Pierre Lorrain (1942–2004), French-Canadian lawyer and politician
- Rod Lorrain (1914–1980), Canadian ice hockey player in the National Hockey League
- Roméo Lorrain (1901–1967), French-Canadian politician
- Louis-Joseph Le Lorrain (1715–1760), French painter and engraver
- Richer of Senones (c. 1190–1266), French monk and chronicler sometimes called Richer le Lorrain in French
- Robert Le Lorrain (1666–1743), French sculptor
- Lorrain Larry Thibeault (1915–1977), Canadian ice hockey player

== Other uses ==
- Canton of Le Lorrain, a former canton of Martinique
- Rivière du Lorrain, a river in Martinique
- Lorrain language, a Romance dialect spoken in the Lorraine region of France and the Gaume region of Belgium
- French torpedo boat Le Lorrain, originally World War II German torpedo boat T28

== See also ==
- Lorrain dormouse, a species of rodent found in Africa
- Lorain (disambiguation)
- Loraine (disambiguation)
- Lorraine (disambiguation)
