= Das Haus und Der Stahl =

Coordinates: 43°6′12″N 78°54′21″W

Das Haus und Der Stahl, also known as Das Haus Museum, are a small campus of buildings containing artifacts that represent the early years of German Lutheran settlers in Western New York originating from Prussia in northern Germany. The buildings were restored and maintained by the Historical Society of North German Settlements in Western New York as a museum of area German heritage. The museum is located in Niagara Falls, New York on the site where Das Haus was originally built. Potter Charles August Mehwaldt created his fired-clay decorative and functional items across the street from the campus.

The Historical Society of North German Settlements in Western New York also hosts Plattdeutsche (Low German) events for residents of the area who continue to speak this language.

== History ==
Originally built in 1843–1844, Das Haus and the Einhaus (a house-barn, where humans and livestock live under one roof, a tactic that provided heat from the animals to benefit the humans in winter) are among the last remaining forms of this type of building. The Einhaus is an example of Prussian-style fachwerk, which employs clay and straw filler in hand hewn timber squares; a remnant of the filler is on display in the Einhaus. Das Haus was primarily constructed of logs. Both were built by individuals among the approximately 800 immigrants in 1843 to a Western New York collection of settlements in Niagara and Erie counties, near Buffalo and Niagara Falls, NY. The immigrants traveled to this part of New York State from New York City by way of the Erie Canal (which was completed in 1825) after crossing the Atlantic Ocean. They embarked from the Prussian port of Stettin.

Between 2013 and 2016 the Einhaus was dismantled from its original location, also in Bergholz, and moved to and reassembled at its present location at 2549 Niagara Road, Niagara Falls (Bergholz), New York.
