= Alys Lorraine =

American operatic soprano

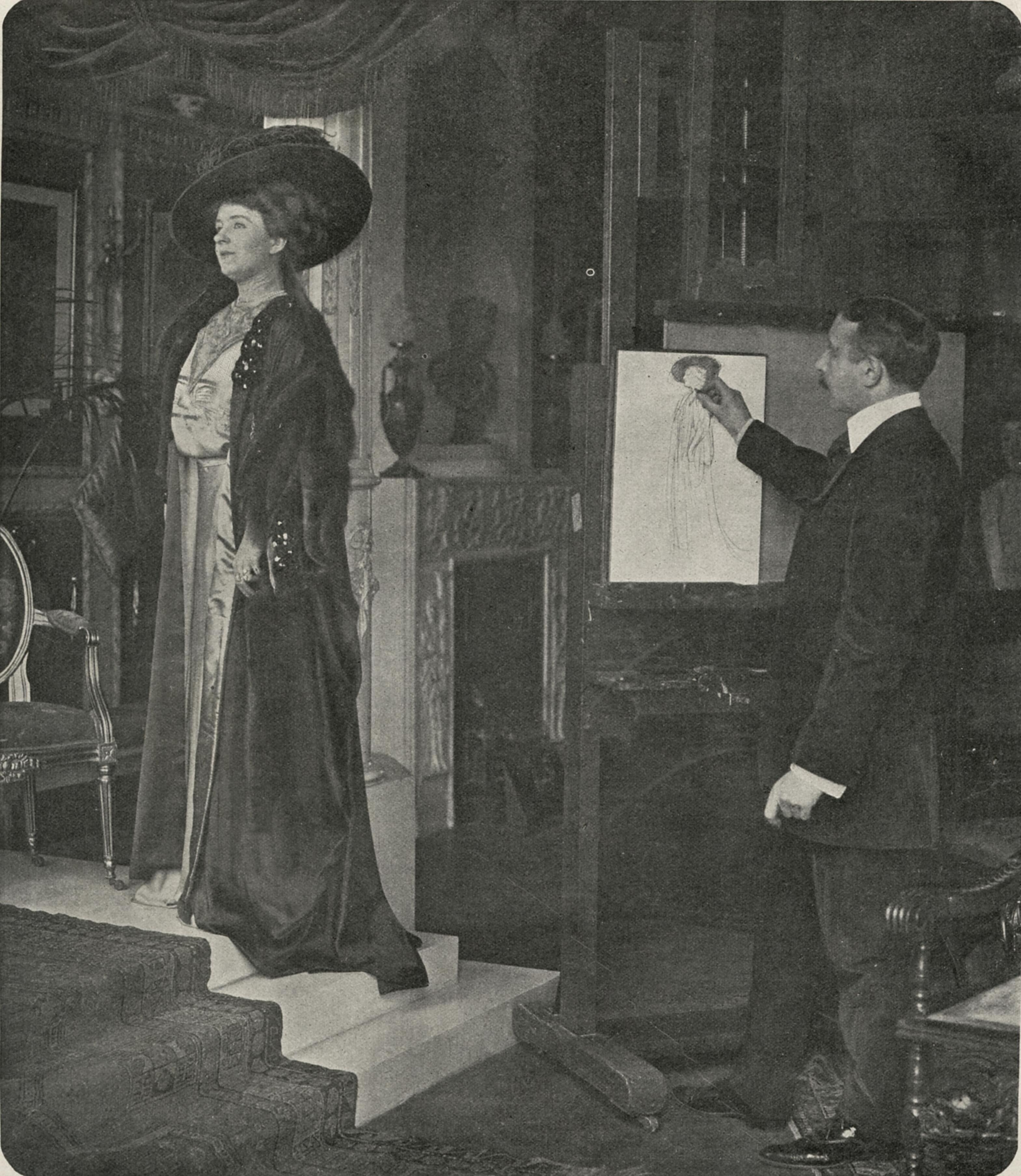
- Alys Lorraine and Antoon van Welie, 1909
- Born: Alice Lorraine; 17 January 1885; Quincy, Illinois
- Died: 13 September 1956 (aged 71)
- Occupation: Opera singer
- Spouse: Richard Northcott

Alys Lorraine (17 January 1885 – 13 September 1956) was an American soprano who was a prominent opera singer and recitalist in Europe during the early twentieth century.

== Early life and education ==
Alys Lorraine (born Alice Lorraine) was born in Quincy, Illinois, and later lived in Minneapolis. She left America for Europe in around 1902, but suffered an illness and was ordered to go to Italy to recover. In Rome, Lorraine met Italian operatic tenor Francesco Tamagno who encouraged her to study the voice after hearing her sing. She received voice lessons from Tamagno for three months, coinciding with the last year of his life. Lorraine continued her studies in Italy with Maestro Organi and Von Schuh, then Studied in Paris under Mathilde Marchesi and Jean de Reszke. She changed her name to Alys after moving to Paris.

== Career ==
Lorraine's career debuted in Genoa where she sang in operas in the 1907 season. Her debut London vocal recital in November that year was at Bechstein Hall and attracted critical attention. The Morning Post described her voice as being "heard at its best when used gently in the mezza-voice: in the more forceable singing her tone coarsens and assumes a certain untunefulness." The source cited Schubert's "Wohin?" and Schumann's "Du bist wie eine Blume" as good examples of her vocal technique. It predicted that Lorraine would become a "vocalist of power and weight". The London Evening Standard reported on this performance and stated that Lorraine possessed "a rare voice, and a rare talent behind it".

In 1908, Lorraine travelled to Monte Carlo for operatic engagement. In June of that year, Lorraine arranged a concert at Bechstein Hall, London, featuring entirely compositions by royalty over 500 years, which were curated by Lorraine and her friends. It included music by Henry VIII, Charles I, Henry IV of France, Wilhelm II, and Princess Henry of Battenberg. This was praised as being an original idea for a concert recital. Lorraine herself stated "Too many concerts are given on conventional lines, both in Paris, where I live, and in London, so I determined when next I sang in England to present a programme which, by reason of its novelty, would arouse some attention." Many of the songs had never been heard in Britain before. The Daily Telegraph and Courier reported that "her sincerity of style infused a new life into some of [the music] – a life which may keep one or two of the songs from oblivion".

Beginning around September 1908, Lorraine performed in The Royal Opera House, The Hague, where she sang as Marguerite in Charles Gounod's Faust. A contemporary review stated that her voice "excited great admiration and there was great applause after the rendering of the 'Jewel Song' in the garden scene". Her depiction was described as "not of the stereotyped order", as she has obtained suggestion from friends of Gounod of how to avoid the conventional treatment of the role. Her debut was so successful that she was offered a two-year contract with the Royal Opera House, during which she also performed in Madama Butterfly.

In 1909, Lorraine performed for Edward VII at a service at Marienbad. She sang his favourite hymn "Nearer, My God, to Thee" and was presented a diamond bracelet as a souvenir. This performance brought Lorraine further into the public eye due to the King's praise of her voice and beauty. Lorraine was the last person to sing for the King before his death. In 1911, she performed in a concert featuring settings of Rudyard Kipling poems.

Her debut at the Paris Opera was in March 1912, where she was coached by Jules Massenet and played Elsa in Lohengrin. She allegedly had no rehearsal with the orchestra ahead of the first performance. It was reported that she had "a very good reception, and French critics declared that her diction was remarkably free from any foreign accent".

Lorraine travelled back to the United States to give performances, including song recitals given in Fargo, North Dakota, and throughout the North West.

By 1931, Lorraine had retired.

== Personal life ==
Lorraine married English music critic Richard Northcott in 1922. Their first interaction was when Northcott criticised Lorraine's singing technique. Lorraine stated "I don't think any other prima-donna has yet married a man who criticised her, but that was years ago, and I have forgiven him." Lorraine was given away in St George's, Hanover Square by Percy Pitt, musical director of The Royal Opera. She and Northcott honeymooned in Italy and Egypt.

Lorraine was friend with many high-profile figures, such as composer Edvard Grieg and his wife. Along with English, she spoke French, German, and Italian. Her fashion and outfits were regularly included in magazines at the time, including Vogue and Vanity Fair. She was named by Vanity Fair as "one of the most smartly dressed women in Paris".
