= Lorraine house =

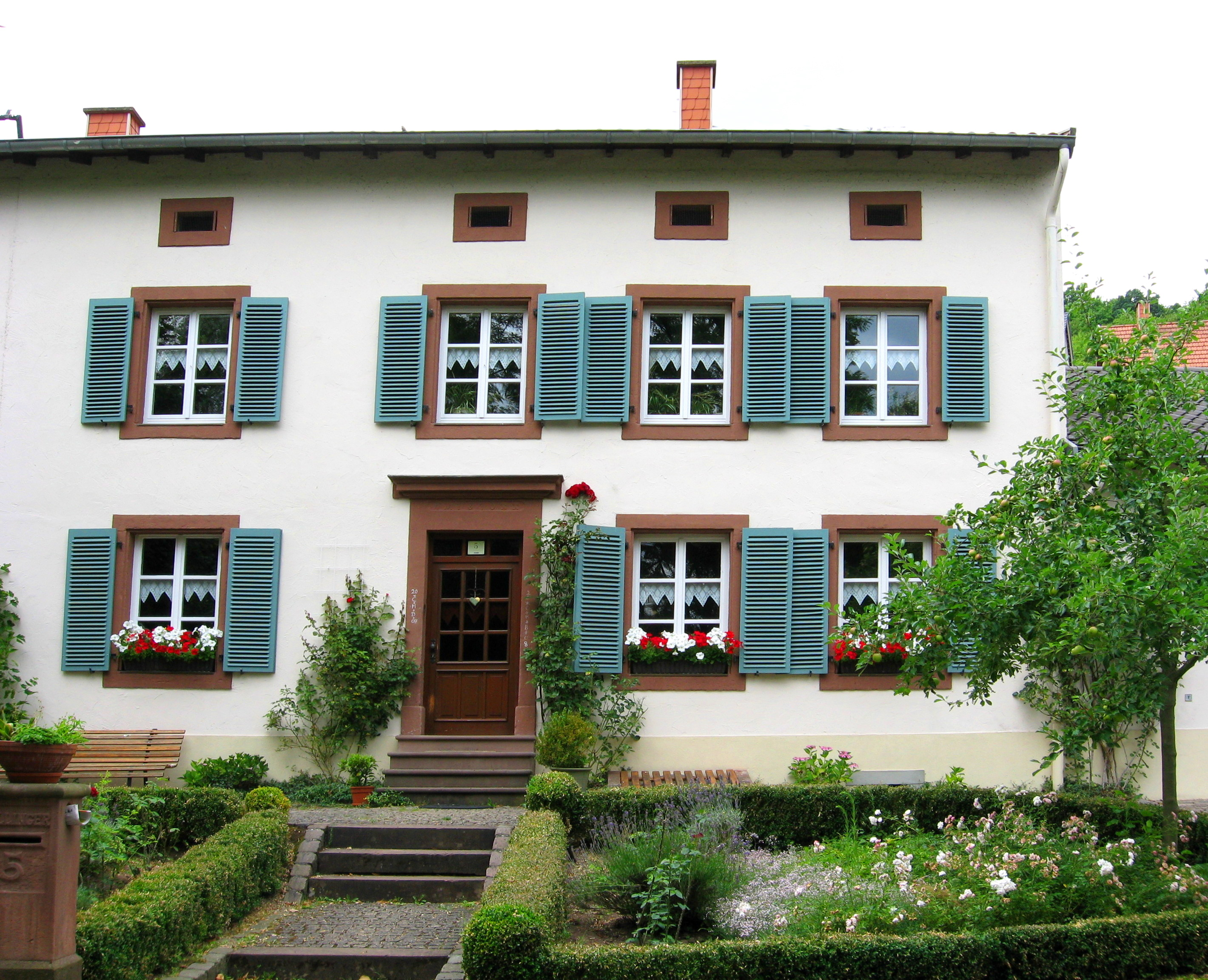
Example in Hemmersdorf

The Lorraine house (German: Lothringerhaus) or Lorraine farmhouse (German: Lothringer Bauernhaus) is a vernacular, agricultural house type found in Lorraine in France and the western part of the Saarland in Germany. It is a byre-dwelling, with the living and working quarters of a farming business combined under one roof. Lorraine houses developed after the devastating wars of the 17th century and took the place of individual scattered farmsteads.

== Overview ==
The Lorraine house stands with its roof ridge parallel to the village street, an eaves side is therefore the front of the house. Neighbouring houses adjoin each other so that a solid row of houses is formed along the road. The Lorraine house is divided at right angles to the roof ridge, i.e. from front to back, into a living area on the one side and a working area on the other; this is referred to as a transversely divided single unit house (German: Quereinhaus).

The living area is on two storeys. Typical of the Lorraine house is a triple room layout, whereby the middle room has no windows if it adjoins a neighbouring house. On the ground floor the kitchen is located between the parlour (front) and chamber (rear). The open hearth in the kitchen acts as heating for the other rooms. Above the first floor there is often an extra half-storey forming a mezzanine floor (known in German as a Drempelgeschoss or Kniestock), recognizable from the ventilation hatches over the windows of the upper storey. Given the same height of roof ridge this meant that the roof pitch was shallower.

The working area consisted of a livestock stall and barn. The stall was located in the middle between the living area and the barn. Carts from the street were able to get to the yard behind the farmhouse through the barn.

The masonry of a Lorraine house is made of irregular stones and is plastered. The lintels, jambs and sills of the windows and doors are picked out both in terms of relief and colour; they are made of local sandstone or limestone. The windows are fitted with wooden shutters. The roof is usually covered with wooden monk and nun tiles.

Renovated Lorraine houses, several turned into museums, may be seen on either side of the Franco-German border between Lorraine and the Saarland. Examples include:

- Haus Saargau a museum in Gisingen from the 18th century with Lorraine furniture
- Several renovated Lorraine houses in Hemmersdorf
- Maison Lorraine, a Lorraine house museum in Oberdorff
- La Vieille Maison de 1710, an eco-museum in Gomelange
