= Héri =

- Gender: Male

Origin
- Origin: Flateyjarbók
- Meaning: Hare
- Region of origin: Faroese

Héri or Heri is a male given name.

In the Faroe Islands, Héri appears in the Flateyjarbók, a history written around 1380, in which Heri Sigmundsson is the youngest son of Sigmundur Brestisson. Heri is a common name in the Faroes today, probably not surviving as a traditional name, but revived and put into use again in later times from historical accounts like Flateyjarbók. Héri may mean "hare" (lepus europaeus), for which the modern Icelandic name is Héri. Alternatively, Héri may be an abbreviation of Norse names beginning with Her-, like Herálfur, Herleifur, or Hergeir.

== People ==
- Heri Dono (born 1960), Indonesian artist
- Heri Joensen (born 1973), Faroese musician
- Heri Martinez de Dios (born 1964), Puerto Rican educator

== See also ==
- Heri (caste)
