= Frisian house =

There are several types of Frisian houses in the Netherlands as well as in Germany.

- Bildts farmhouse
- Frisian farmhouse
- Geestharden house
- Gulf house
- Old Frisian longhouse
- Uthland-Frisian house
