= Middle German house =

German traditional farmhouse style

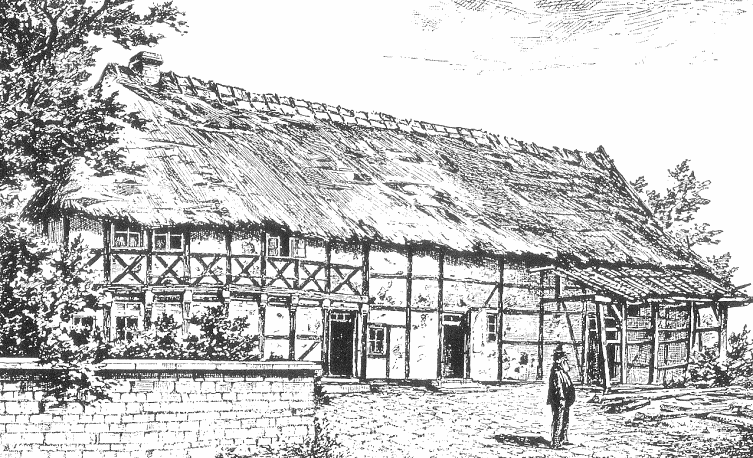
A timber-framed Middle German house in Klein Schöppenstedt near Cremlingen around 1900

Simplified ground floor plan of a Middle German house. Key: Stube: living quarters, Kachelofen: cocklestove, Küche: kitchen, Herd: stove, Flur: hallway, Futterraum: fodder area, Kühe: cows, Pferde: horses, Diele/Scheune: barn, Unterfahrt: porch, Wohnen: living area, Wirtschaftsbereich: working area

The Middle German house (German: mitteldeutsches Haus) is a style of traditional German farmhouse which is predominantly found in Central Germany.

It is known by a variety of other names, many of which indicate its regional distribution:

- Ernhaus (hall house, hall kitchen house)
- Oberdeutsches Haus (Upper German house)
- Thüringisches Haus (Thuringian house)
- Fränkisches Haus (Franconian house)

The Middle German house first emerged in the Middle Ages as a type of farmhouse built either using timber framing or stone. It is an 'all-in-one' house (Einhaus) with living quarters and livestock stalls under one roof. This rural type of farmstead still forms part of the scene in many villages in the central and southern areas of Germany. The northern boundary of its distribution area is roughly where the Central Uplands merge into the North German Plain. There, its place is gradually taken by the Low German house (Fachhallenhaus), known colloquially as the Niedersachsenhaus (Low Saxon house). An important distinction between the two types of farmhouse is that the roof of the Middle German house is supported by its outer walls, whereas that of the Low German house is supported by internal, wooden posts.

== Construction ==
The Middle German house is a byre-dwelling (Wohnstallhaus) with entrances to the various rooms down one side. The front door is thus at the side of the building and opens into the Ern, a Franconian expression for the central hallway or Flur, and cooking area.

The house is divided into three zones:

- Living quarters (Stube)
- Hallway (Flur or Ern) (with the stove or kitchen)
- Working area – stalls or stables (Stall)

The Ern is the central area of the house and has a stove area (later a kitchen) at the back. This developed from the ancient hearth near the main entrance or between the doors if the house had a "crosspassage". On one side of the Flur there is a doorway to the living area and on the other to the working area. From the outset the house had two fireplaces. In the living room, the Stube, there was a cocklestove, and in the Flur was a stove for cooking, which was later partitioned off to form a kitchen.

Initially, this type of house only had one storey, but from about the 15th century they were usually built in two storeys with a ground floor and upper floor. From the 17th century the upper storey was built as a jetty and had artistic features such as beam heads (Balkenköpfe) and wall plates (Schwellen). In this period, the larger farms were built with several buildings that served as the living accommodation, barn and stable or byre of a two-, three- or four-sided farmyard.

== See also ==
- Gulf house (East Frisia and North Germany)
- Old Frisian farmhouse (The Netherlands and North German Plain)
- Geestharden house
- Vernacular architecture
