= Post and beam =

Post and beam is a general term for building with heavy timbers. More specific types of post and beam framing are:

- Timber framing, an ancient traditional method of building using wooden joinery held together with pegs, wedges and rarely iron straps
- Post and lintel, a simple form of framing with lintels resting on top of posts
- Ständerhaus, a historic type of post and beam construction in Germany
  - Firstständerhaus, a specific type with posts supporting the ridge beam used in North German farmhouses
