= Winsen Museum Farm =

Open-air museum in Germany

Coordinates: 52.6803°N 9.92056°E

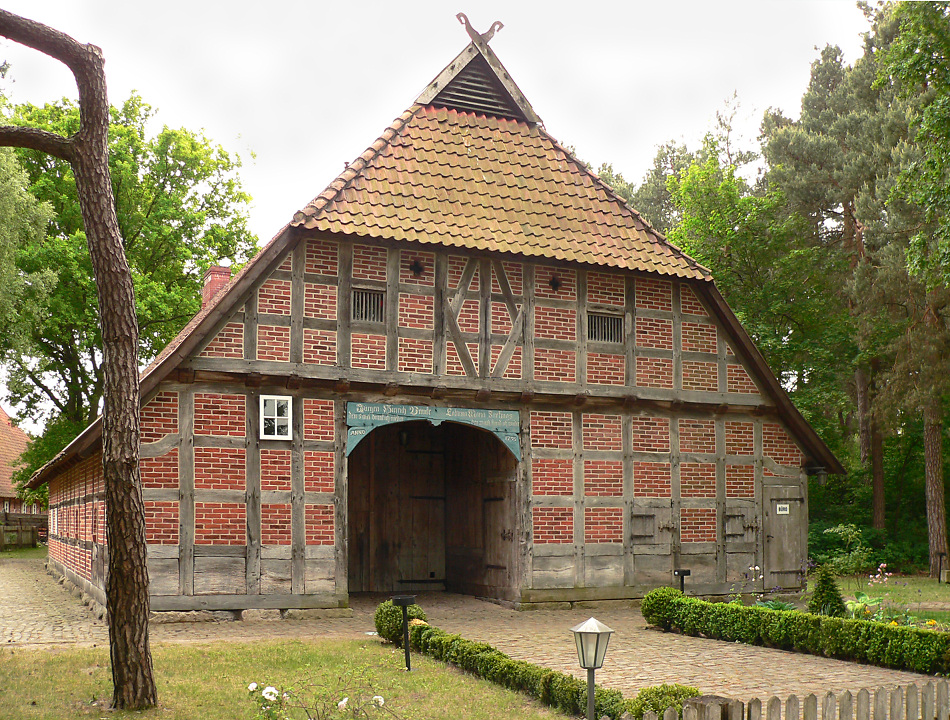
Dat groode Hus, a 1795 Fachhallenhaus, today a cultural events centre

The Winsen Museum Farm (German: Museumshof Winsen) is an open-air museum in Winsen (Aller) in the north German state of Lower Saxony. It was started in 1982 and comprises a typical farmyard from the southern Lüneburg Heath around which other buildings, characteristic of the region, are grouped.

== Museum site ==
The museum is situated in the residential part of Winsen within an extensive, tree-covered area with a low hill and the typical appearance of heath country.

The museum is sponsored by the Winsen Local Heritage Society (Winsener Heimatverein) which was founded in 1979 by 10 people. Currently (2009) the society has about 800 members. The members have largely carried out the building work on the museum site themselves.

== Buildings ==
All the buildings in the open-air museum were moved to this site. They were originally built between the mid-17th century and the 20th century. Their interiors and the implements exhibited stem mainly from the 19th century.

=== Farmyards ===
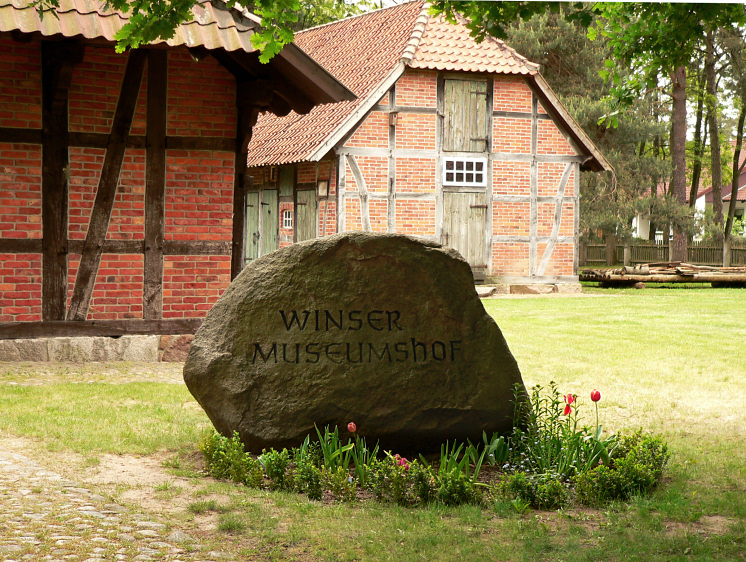
Inscribed stone in front of the main farm building from 1653, pig shed on the right

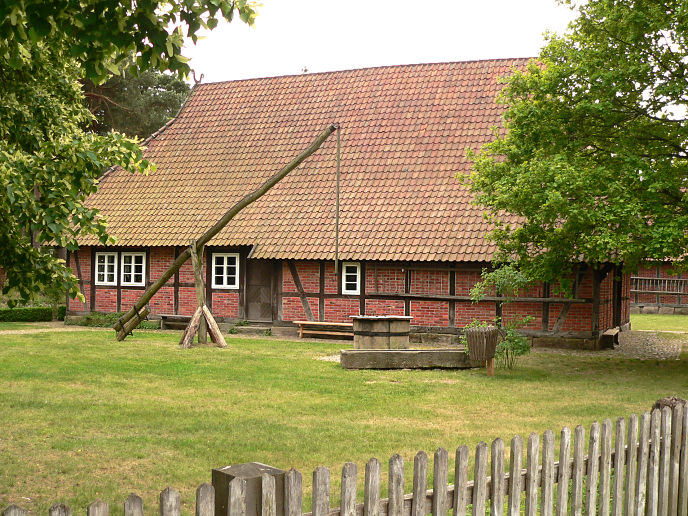
The main building with its draw well

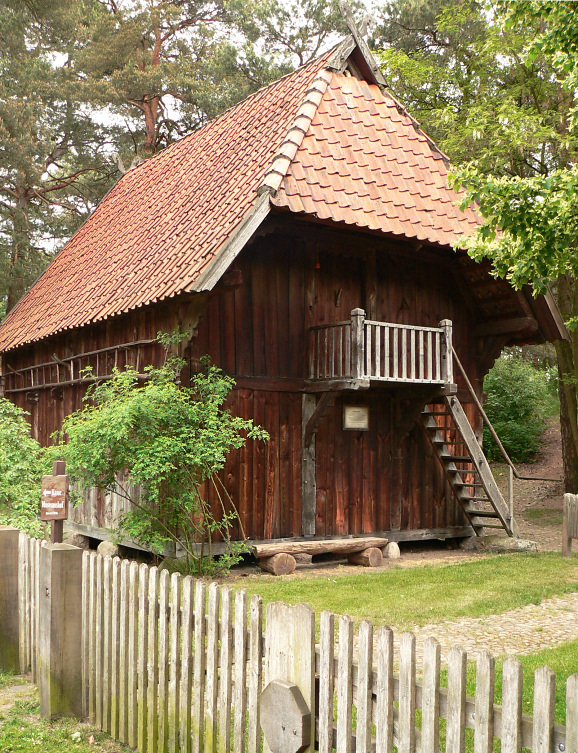
Treppenspeicher storage barn

The centrepiece of the museum is a rural farmstead from the Südheide ("South Heath"), which has 6 historical buildings. The main building is a Lower Saxon house, the so-called Fachhallenhaus, a timber-framed, hall house divided into bays, built in Winsen in 1653. In 1980 it was transferred from its former site and in 1982 rebuilt on its new location as the open-air museum's first building.

Amongst the outbuildings are a barn dating back to 1727 and an 1840 hay barn from Hornbostel made of wood previously used in other buildings. The pig shed from 1860 was part of a farmyard in Südwinsen until 1985. A storage barn with outside staircase (Treppenspeicher) from the first half of the 18th century houses exhibitions with beekeeping equipment and items of laundry made of linen. The barn was moved to Winsen in 1981 from its original site on the Bergen-Hohne Training Area. The bakehouse was reconstructed from old prototypes and is occasionally used to bake bread.

=== Other buildings ===
Other historical buildings from the region have been rebuilt on the museum site, bordering the farmyard. The main one is Dat groode Hus, a farmhouse that dates back to 1795 in Buchholz (Aller) and was transported here in 1991. As the largest building in the museum it is used for cultural events such as concerts, recital and presentations. It has a Trauzimmer for the community. In 2005 the Kalandhof farm, that had existed in Winsen since 1781, was rebuilt here. Its name is based on the duty owed by the builder to the Kaland brotherhood. The museum cafe is located here. The other buildings are an 1860 coach house and two other Treppenspeicher barns. An apiary provides an insight into heath beekeeping which was formerly widespread in this area. Finally, there is also a fruit orchard with apple trees common to the region.

== See also ==
- Open-air museum

== Literature ==
- Museumshof Winsen (Aller) - The little museum guide
