= Hösseringen Museum Village =

Open-air museum in Germany

Coordinates: 52°50′38″N 10°24′24″E

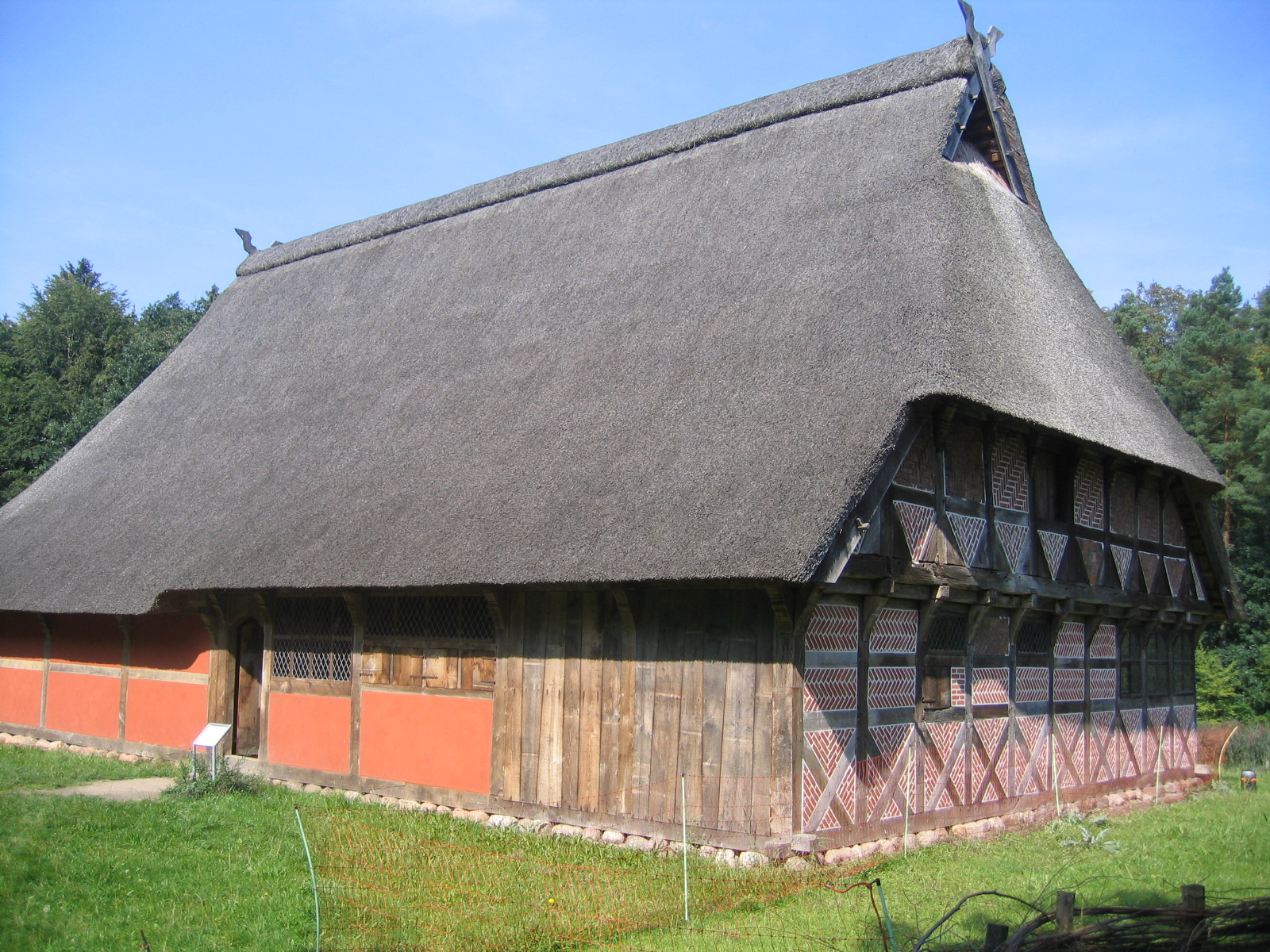
Low Saxon farmhouse

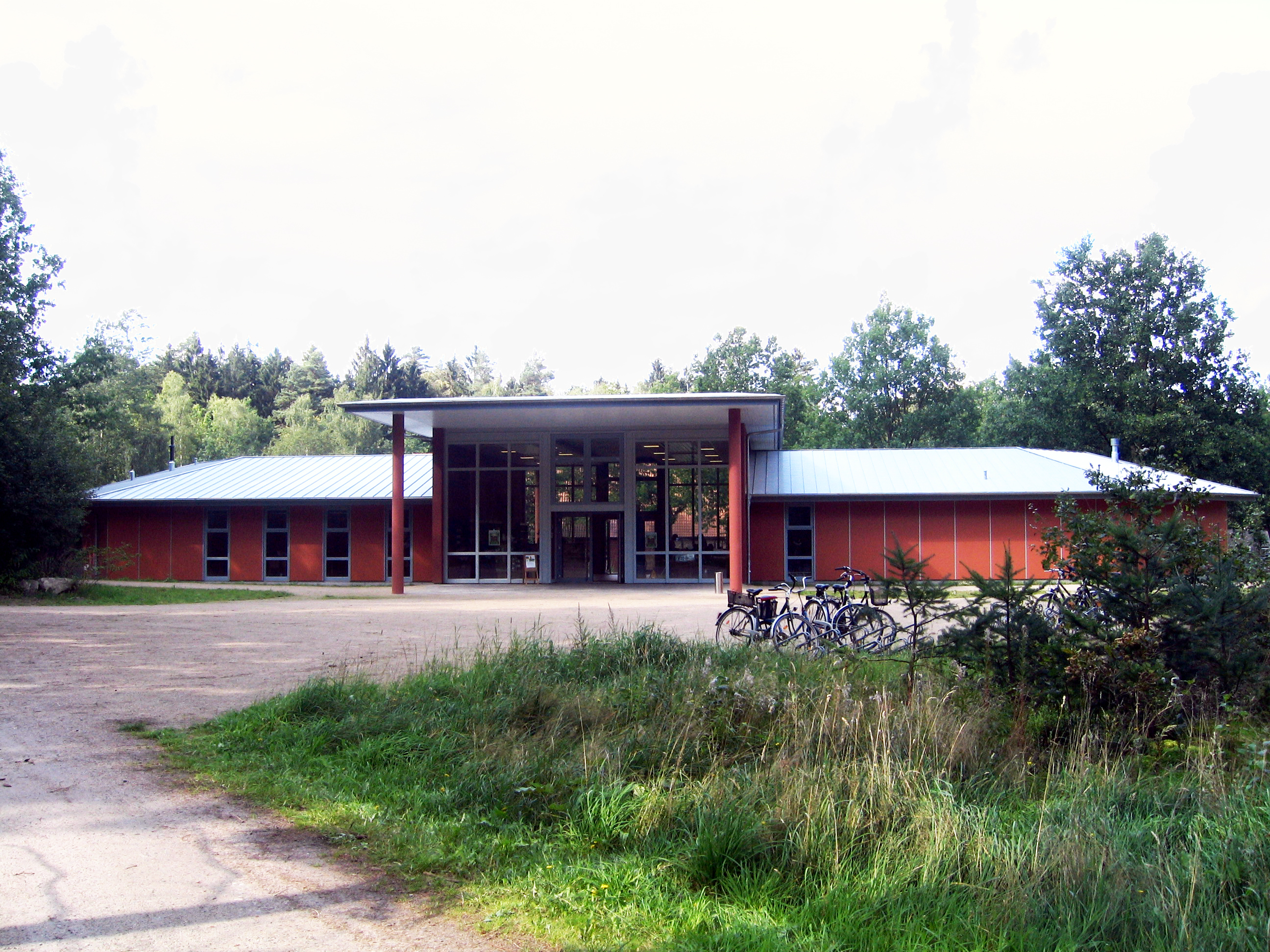
Entrance to the museum village

The Hösseringen Museum Village (German: Museumsdorf Hösseringen) is located at Hösseringen in the German state of Lower Saxony. Covering an area of 10,000 square metres (2.5 acres), it displays important examples of the Lower German, timber-framed, open-hall house, the so-called Low German house or Fachhallenhaus.

These buildings are all faithful reconstructions, the majority stemming from Uelzen district, that have been dismantled, moved and rebuilt on the site. To date, 26 buildings from the 16th to 19th centuries have been reconstructed. The centrepiece of the museum village is the Brümmerhof hall house (Hallenhaus), a single-building farmhouse (Einzelhof) from the early 17th century.

Permanent exhibitions give insights into the working methods and implements used for beekeeping, sheep farming, spinning, weaving, forging, and many other rural activities. In addition to the exhibitions, great emphasis is placed on demonstrating the sequence of operations used in historical crafts and the methods employed in country areas. For example, horses are frequently shoed in the smithy and, in other buildings, cloth is woven or bread baked. Farm gardens representing the period around 1900 are maintained and illustrate the life of country folk.

The site of the Hösseringen Museum Village is surrounded by the dense forests of the Lüneburg Heath that form a natural backdrop for the buildings and agricultural displays of the village.

The museum village was founded in 1975 by the Lüneburg Heath Country Museum Society (Verein Landwirtschaftsmuseum Lüneburger Heide). The society produces its own publications that are mainly on the subject of the rural history of the Lüneburg Heath and the crafts and techniques used there and which promote the subject area portrayed by the Hösseringen Museum Village across Germany.

== See also ==
- Open-air museum

== Sources ==
- E. Bengen, U. Brohm, H. W. Löbert et al.: Steinreiche Heide: Verwendung und Bearbeitung von Findlingen 1998 ISBN 3-933943-00-0
- Andreas Vonderach: Agrargeschichte im Freilichtmuseum. Das Museumsdorf Hösseringen als Landwirtschaftsmuseum der Lüneburger Heide. In: Gerd Vonderach (ed.): Begegnung mit historischen Arbeitswelten: Ausgewählte ländliche Museen mit Schwerpunkten vergangener regionaler Wirtschaftsweisen (= Buchreihe Land-Berichte. Vol. 6). Shaker, Aachen 2012, ISBN 978-3-8440-0741-1, pp. 30 ff.
