= Uthland-Frisian house =

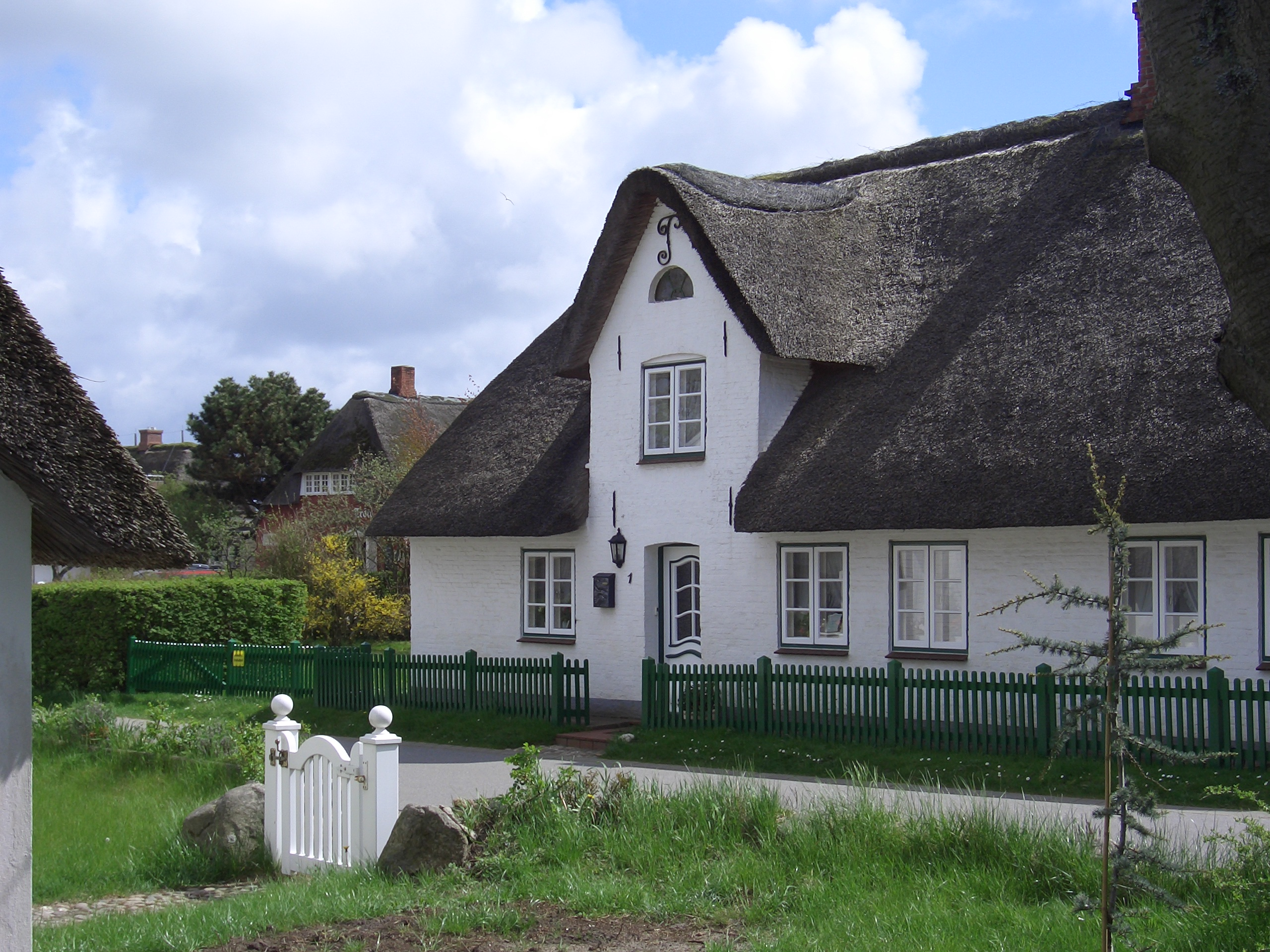
Uthland-Frisian house in Nebel (Amrum) with gable dormer over the entrance

The Uthland-Frisian house (German: Uthlandfriesisches Haus or Uthländisches Haus Danish: Frisergård or Frisisk gård), a variation of the Geestharden house, is a type of farmhouse that, for centuries, dominated the North Frisian Uthlande, that is the North Frisian Islands, the Halligen and the marshlands of northwest Germany.

== Design ==
The farmhouses have the features of all Frisian houses: the walls are made of red brick and have a thatched roof and white or blue window frames and doors. The buildings, which recall the early medieval long houses, were originally relatively small and had an internal wooden frame. This meant that in the event that one of the huge coastal storms, that regularly batter the area, badly damaged the roof and walls, the internal structure continued to provide its occupants with some protection. In the Uthland houses, the livestock stall and living area were combined under one roof, but separated by a narrow cross-passage. The stall has a longitudinal passage with a door at the gable and only a small threshing place.

The farmhouses are built on an east–west axis in order to present the smallest possible surface area to the prevailing westerly winds. The entrances to the stall and living areas are on the leeward southern side. Because the size of the house is necessarily restricted due to its design, there are often adjacent animal sheds. One striking feature is that all buildings of such an ensemble have their entrances on the same side. This is particularly noticeable on the Halligen. Because cattle farming and sailing were the main means of livelihood in the areas concerned, large store rooms for the harvest were not needed. As a result, Uthland-Frisian houses had no space for grain and hay storage apart from the attic.

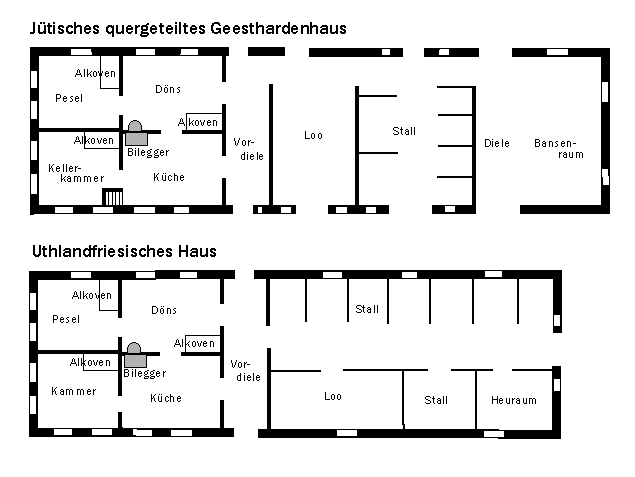
Division of rooms in an Uthland-Frisian house for comparison

Unlike the Geestharden houses on the mainland, the so-called Uthland-Frisian houses had a pointed gable over the entrance way which extended to just under the main roof ridge. The Frisian houses on the mainland had a wider, less pointed gable (Backengiebel). This gable (wide or pointed) was designed so that, in the event of fire, burning thatch on the roof did not slide down over the entranceway, but fell to the left and right of the gable. This kept the escape route clear.

The structural load of these houses rests on a frame of posts and beams, which means that the load of the roof and the hayloft is born by wooden posts that are positioned inside the non-load bearing outer walls. The outer walls only serve as protection against the weather and can be designed to be relatively weak from a structural loading perspective. Because islands and Halligen were largely treeless, marine debris, such as ships' masts and planks washed up on the shore, was used for the internal timber frame.

The foundation of the houses, which had no cellars as a rule, consisted of field boulders. In several houses, under the kitchen, a low store room was let into the ground and walled with boulders to act as a cold store and storage room.

Another feature of the Uthland-Frisian houses is the half door or Klöntür. This door is divided horizontally, so that the upper half can be opened independently, for example, in order to ventilate the room. The closed lower half prevents the small animals, that were often kept around the house, from entering the living room. The half-open door is ideal for chatting to neighbours, an activity known in Sylt Frisian as Klöön (Low German Klönen); hence the name of this type of door.

Well preserved and typical Uthland houses, such as Tadsen (built 1741) and Sönnichsen (today housing the local history museum), for example, are found on the Hallig of Langeneß; another one is the Öömrang Hüs on Amrum. Haus Olesen, originally built in 1617, was demolished and rebuilt in Wyk auf Föhr, and is now the oldest preserved house of this type. It, too, belongs to a local history museum.

== Sources ==
- Ellen Bauer, Ludwig Fischer, Hans Joachim Kühn, Matthias Maluck & Dirk Meier: The Schleswig-Holstein Wadden Sea Region. Lancewad Report 2001 des Wattenmeer-Sekretariats. Download page
