= Geestharden house =

Type of rural house in northern Germany

The Geestharden house (German: Geesthardenhaus), also called the Cimbrian house (Cimbrisches Haus), Schleswig house (Schleswiger Haus), Slesvig house (Danish: Slesvigsk gård) or Southern Jutland house (Sønderjysk gård) due to its geographical spread in Jutland, is one of three basic forms on which the many farmhouse types in the north German state of Schleswig-Holstein are based. The other two basic designs are the Gulf house (including its variant, the Haubarg) and the Low German hall house. By far the best known variant of the Geestharden house is the Uthland-Frisian house (Uhtlandfriesische Haus or Frisergård), which is also referred to as the Frisian house (Friesenhaus).

== Geographical spread ==
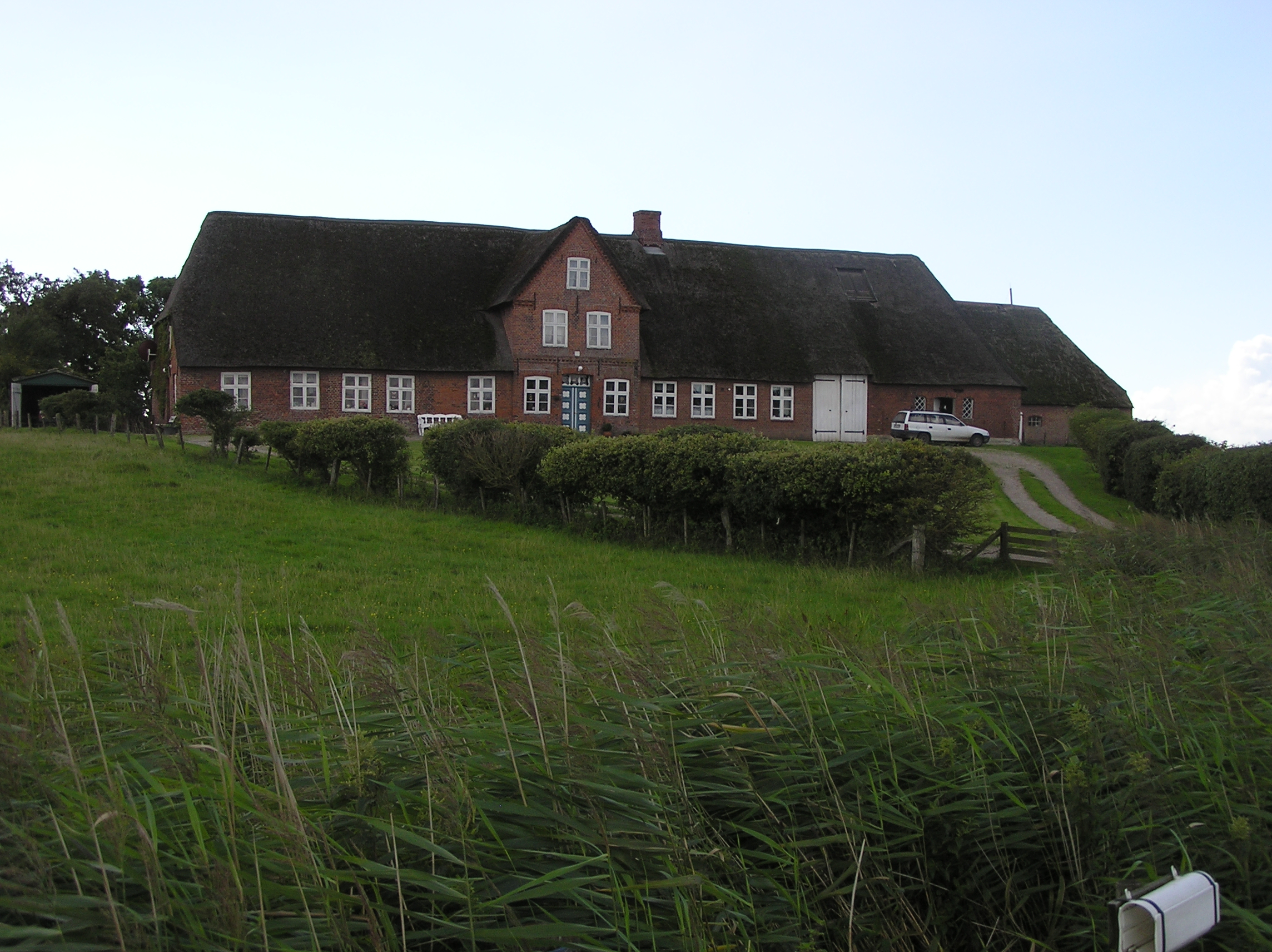
Geestharden house in Ockholm

In spite of its description, the Geestharden house is not just found on geest, a rolling landscape that was formed as a result of ice age glacial deposition, but also in the Marsch, the flat marshlands on the North Sea coast of Germany.

Geestharden houses occur predominantly in Southern Schleswig in Germany and Northern Schleswig in Denmark. Their development is still largely unresearched, the research carried out during the period of Nazi Germany being disputed to some extent because at that time there were attempts to link the various house types to ethnic groups and thereby to support territorial claims. Geestharden houses are however rarely the only type of house in a region, they are often found together with four-sided farms (Vierseithöfen) or – especially in the southern part of Southern Schleswig – with Low German hall houses.

The Uthland-Frisian house with its structural adaptations for flood-prone regions is mainly found on the islands and Halligen of North Frisia.

== History ==
Just like its southern neighbour – with which there is some geographic overlap – the Low German Hall House, this type of house is considered to be a development of the Bronze Age Germanic longhouse (Germanisches Wohnstallhaus). This, in turn, was based on the Neolithic longhouse which came from outside the Germanic culture and was considerably more widespread.

== Design ==
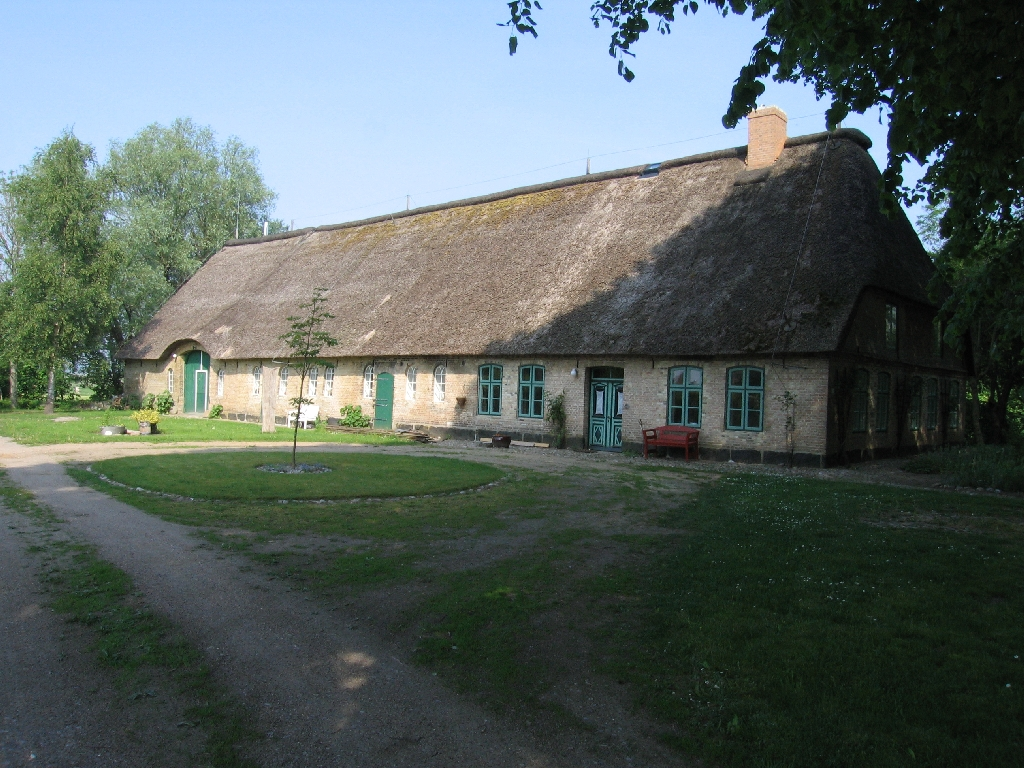
Haus Stamp in Seeth/Nordfriesland

The Geesthardenhaus is a transversely-divided, traufständiges longhouse, its side and roof being aligned with the street. The accommodation and living areas are housed under one roof, but unlike the Low German Hall House they are not joined.

The house has a two-post (Zweiständer) design, whereby the posts, which support the usually-thatched roof half-hipped roof, are near to the outer walls. From the late 18th century the roof in the living area has been carried on the supporting outer walls. This variation, however, was only used in areas that were protected by strong dykes and was not adopted by Uthland-Frisian houses which occurred in regions endangered by storm surges. Even if the walls and the ground floor of such a post-and-beam house are destroyed by flooding, there is a very high probability that the upper storey will survive, so that the occupants of the house can take refuge on the roof. Ever since the serious North Sea flood of 1962, newly built Hallig houses have been given concrete posts with deep foundations in order to improve their safety still further.

Another feature of the Uthland-Frisian house is that they were moved from time to time because they stood on warfts that could sink or become saturated over the course of the centuries, thus endangering the house. Because building materials, especially wood, were scarce and expensive, it was formerly common everywhere, to take the houses apart and move them if the warft was no longer safe or was otherwise abandoned.

The walls of the houses were originally made of turves, clay or wood, most of the houses that survive today, however, have brick walls. Different types of brick were used. On the outer wall, hard and expensive, very weather-resistant bricks were used, whilst softer and cheaper bricks, the so-called Bleekers, were preferred for the insides of outer walls and for the interior walls. Timber-framed designs were and are extremely rare.

Geestharden houses are usually thatched. To prevent rainwater accumulating in the thatch, the roofs have a very steep pitch. Most of the houses also have a gable dormer (Zwerchgiebel) with a half-hipped roof over the entrance, i.e. a gable that runs at right angles to the main roof ridge. This design enables the house to be evacuated in the event of fire without burning thatch falling on the escaping occupants.

== Accommodation ==
In the living area are the living rooms and kitchen, a cellar and, above it, a cellar chamber (Kellerstuben). The kitchen has a chimney. The living area is normally on one side of a narrow hallway or Diele that runs from one side of the building to the other and has an entrance both at the front as well as at the back into the garden. This corridor (Flur) separates the living area from the working area.

=== Döns ===
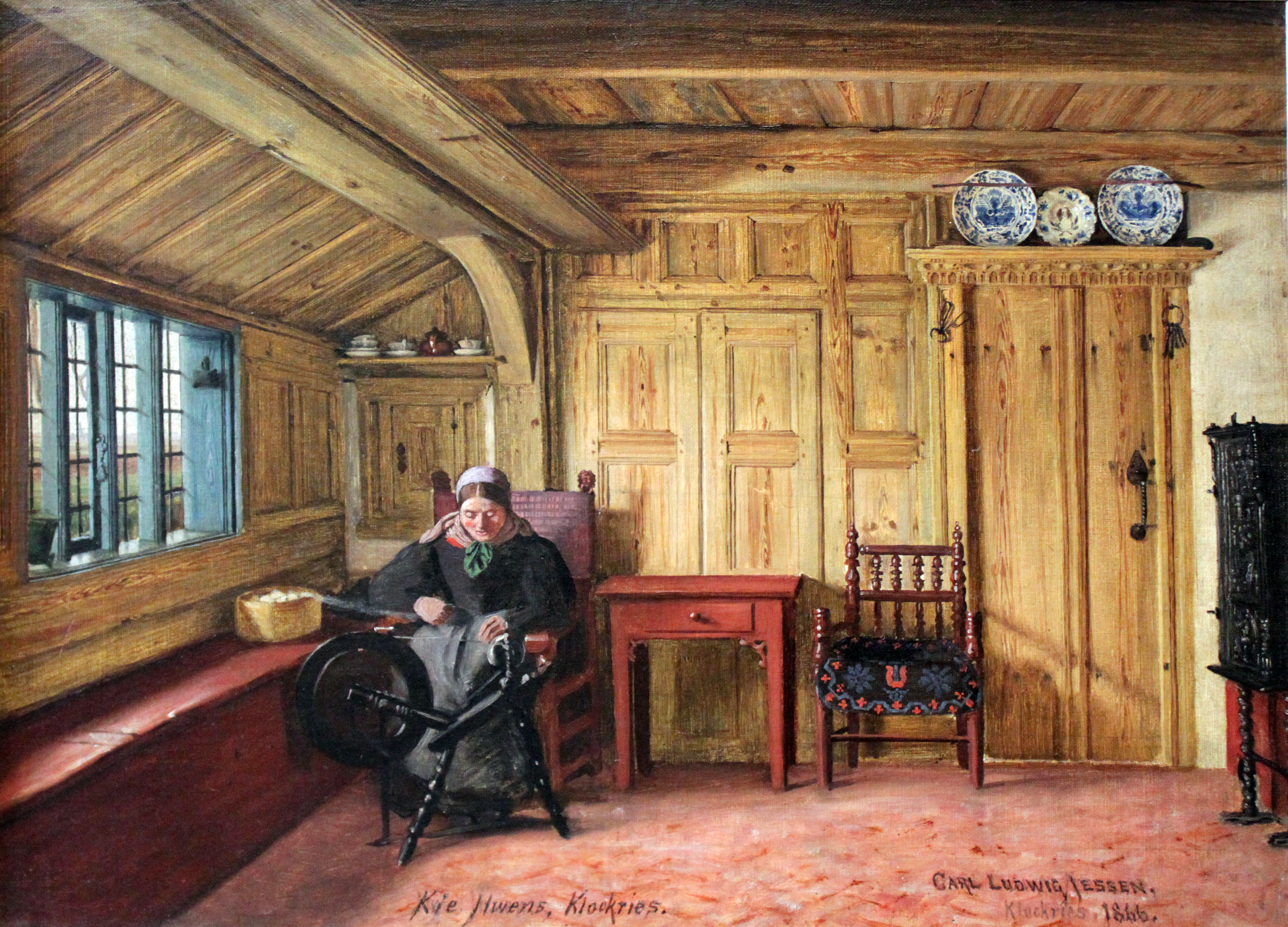
A Döns in Klockries. Above left in the room, the Katschur. Right: in the corner is the Bilegger. Behind the table are probably doors to the Alkoven.

The Döns or Dörnsch (Danish: Dørns) was a heated living room, in which the daily life of the farmhouse revolved. Here they ate, worked and, in the alcoves that were let into the intermediate walls between the rooms, they slept.

From the 16th century the room was heated by a Bilegger (Bilæggerovn), an oven that was heated by the open hearth in the kitchen, the only other room in the house that was heated. In this way smoke could not enter the living room. For fuel, wood, peat or -especially on the Halligen which were chronically short of raw materials - dried cowpats known as Ditten.

To begin with the Bileggers were made of brick, but from the 17th century they were superseded increasingly by cast iron models, that could have very practical decorations, such as several unscrewable brass knobs, on which hands could be warmed, or a brass hood under which food or tea could be kept warm.

=== Alcoves ===
The sleeping quarters were known as alcoves (German: Alkoven, Danish: Alkover) and were normally very compact: one metre wide, 2.50 m high and 1.70 m long. They could be screened with curtains or a wooden wall with a hatch which kept them warmer. On the other hand, they were difficult to ventilate and often damp. Often several people used one alcove. They could be heated with a bedwarmer filled with glowing coals or hot water. They slept in a sitting position, probably due to a superstition that death usually overtook a person when lying down.

There were also alcoves in the working part of the houses, usually for the farmhands and servants.

=== Pesel ===
The Pesel (Danish: Pisel) was the "parlour" (Gute Stube) of the farmhouse, which was only used on special occasions. It could not be heated.

=== Katschur ===
The Katschur is a sloping section of the ceiling resulting from the design of the roof in post-and-beam buildings. The ceiling started at the point where the roof lay on the posts.

=== Wall tiles ===
In many Frisian houses the walls of the Pesel, Döns or cellar chamber (Kellerkammer) were covered with Lower Saxon wall tiles, or Delftware. They often had Biblical scenes, pictures of ships or rural scenes with blue or purple glazing in circular designs on a white background. The motives were not repeated.

Several tiles could also be put together to produce a large picture in the form of a tableau. These often depicted ships or floral designs.

== Working area ==
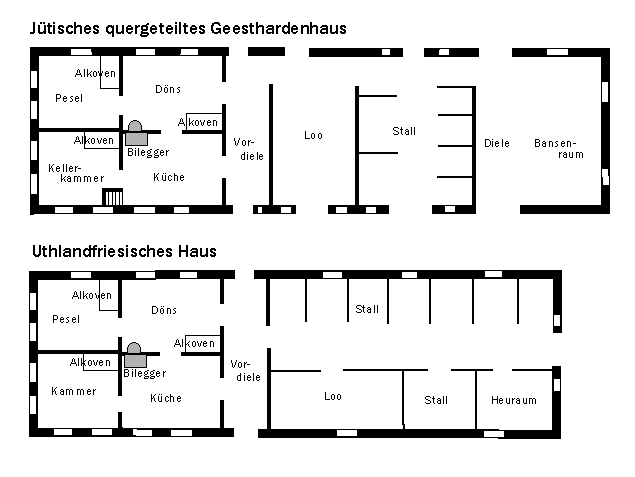
Various room divisions in the working area of the Geestharden and Uthland-Frisian houses

Whilst the basic division of rooms in the living areas of Geestharden and Uthland-Frisian houses was the same, the rooms in the working area were laid out differently.

=== Geestharden house ===
In the Geestharden house adjacent to the living area was usually a threshing floor called the Loo or Loohdiele, followed by the stall, a hall or threshing floor (Diele) and the hay store or Bansenraum.

All these rooms had doors onto the street on the side of the eaves, so that the building had several entrances on that side. On the back of the building often ran a long under the eaves passageway which joined the individual rooms.

Above the entrances to the Loo and Diele in the working area were often round dormers (Rundgauben), to allow the entrances to be higher.

Because of the method of construction, the working area could be extended either into an L-shaped building or even a in the shape of a square with an inner courtyard, depending on the situation. The latter type is known as a four-sided farmstead or Vierseithof.

=== Uthland-Frisian house ===
The living area in the Uthland-Frisian house is also separated from the working area, but it has entrances at the gable end of the house and none along the sides. The stalls and storage rooms are accessed from a long passageway in the middle of the building, as in the Lower Saxon house. These farmhouses are mainly found in very exposed locations and are therefore almost always built in an east–west orientation in order to present as small an area as possible to the prevailing west winds. The living area is always on the eastern, leeward, side.
