= Gulf house =

Style of North German farmouse

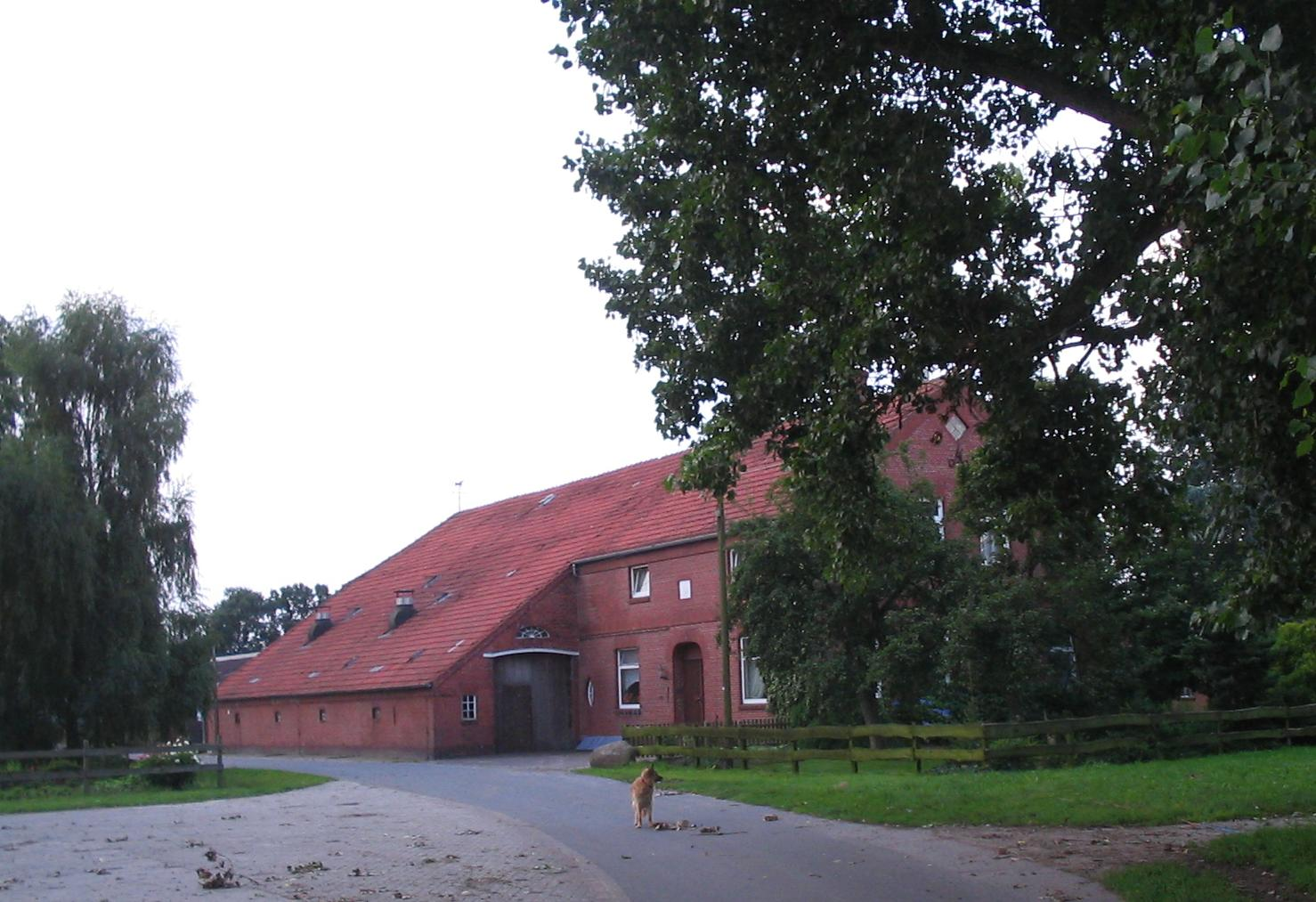
A Gulf house in the district of Leer - front and barn door

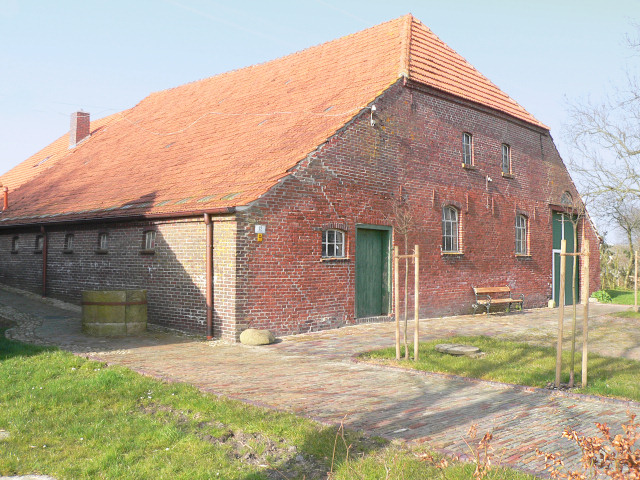
Gulf house in brick in the Wangerland. Back of house with barn door (right) and stable door (left).

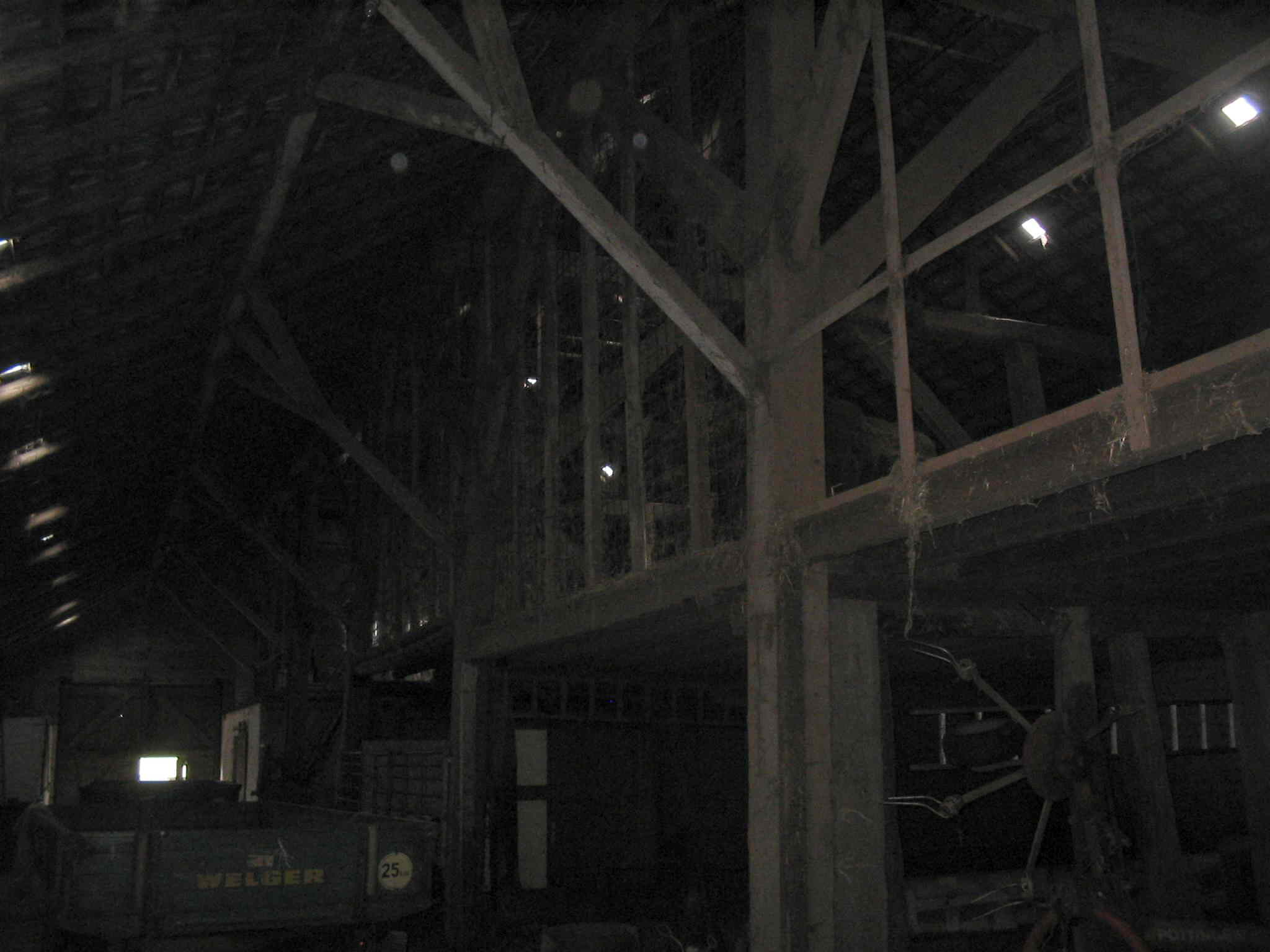
Roof design of an East Frisian Gulf house from inside, seen from the threshing floor (dêel)

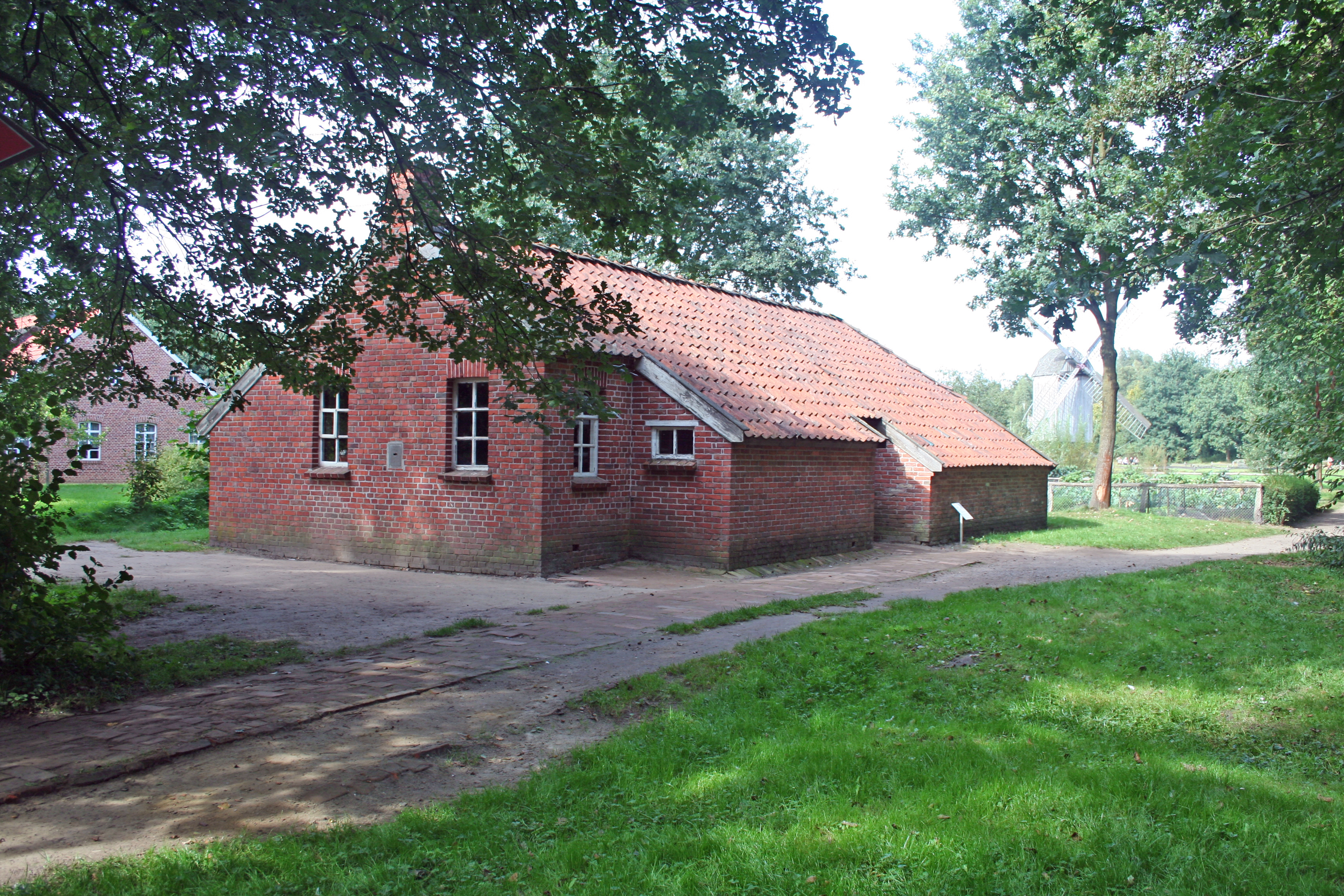
Farm labourer's house at the Cloppenburg Museum Village

A gulf house (East Frisian Low Saxon: gulfhuus; German: Gulfhaus), also called a gulf farmhouse (gulfhof) or East Frisian house (Oostfräisenhuus), is a type of byre-dwelling that emerged in the 16th and 17th centuries in North Germany. The core of the gulf house consists of a timber‑framed barn, which is built using a post-and-beam construction. Initially gulf houses and gulf barns appeared in the coastal marshes, but later spread to the Frisian uplands or geest. They were distributed across the North Sea coastal regions from Brabant and West Flanders through the Netherlands, East Frisia and Oldenburg as far as Schleswig-Holstein (as a variant called the Haubarg) and Northern Jutland. This spread was interrupted by the Elbe-Weser Triangle which developed a type of Low German house instead, better known as the Low Saxon house.

Historically, the gulf house belongs to a larger group of aisled barns, which also include medieval tithe barns, monastery granges and Early Modern buildings on farms and manors in France, Britain, the Low Countries, Germany, Scandinavia and the United States. The East Frisian Low Saxon word gulf (West Frisian: golle) is derived from Scandinavian gulv ('storage floor') and has probably spread in the context of medieval monastic farms.

In the Netherlands, a distinction is made between the Frisian barn as such, and the related farm subtype known as the Oldambt farm, which in Germany is also called the Ostfriesenhaus. The other subtypes are the Frisian farmhouse ("house with Frisian barn"), the Haubarg or stolpboerderij (a type of housebarn from North-Holland and Eiderstedt), and the closely related stjelp farm in Friesland. Main types of gulf barns are the Flemish barn, the Brabant barn or grange en long, the Zeeland barn, the West-Flemish bergschuur, and the Northern Jutland agerumslade.

== Emergence ==
The gulf house and gulf barn owe their emergence to economic circumstances. Before their introduction the peasants of the Frisian North Sea marshes lived in Old Frisian farmhouses (Altfriesischer Bauernhaus or oud-Friese boerenhuis), a so-called byre-dwelling (Wohnstallhaus). These relatively small buildings had enough working space because they did not have to store large harvests. Cereal farming was only possible on a higher-lying grounds, whilst large parts of the poorly drained marshes were only suitable as meadow and pasture.

The agricultural boom in the 16th and early 17th centuries, however, resulted in an increase of arable land and led to the embankment of new polders, which were ideally suited for cereal farming. Improved drainage technologies also resulted in an increase of arable land. The growing demand for dairy products, moreover, stimulated the emergence of large pastoral farms. In order to store the growing harvest quantities a house with greater storage capacity was needed, which is how the gulf house came into being. Medieval tith barns and monastic granges may have offererd the example.

== Design ==
The typical East-Frisian gulf house consisted of a living space (fööeräen) and an adjoining working area (achteräen) with stable and barn. By extending the roof downwards in the rear part of the house, side bays (Abseiten) were created, the so-called ūtkübben, so that the barn area became wider than the living area. The centre of the stable and barn section formed the gulf, a storage area for hay, harvest products and tools, which gave this type of house its name.

In one of the side bays were compartments or stalls for keeping cattle (kaustâl). The walkway running in front of them was called the kaugâng ("cow passage"). At the far end there was traditionally the privy (gemak).

At the gable end of the working area were two doors: a large barn door (sğüerdööer) on one side, that gave access for wagons to the threshing floor (dösdêl) and the gulf, and a small, double door (messeldööer) on the other side. The latter derived its name because it was the door through which cattle dung was carried from the kaugâng (dung = mäers; remove dung = messen).

There was often a semi-circular window in a metal frame over the large barn door which was designed in the form of a stylised rising sun.

The front part of the middle section, at the gable end, in which the horse stable (pêrstâl) was housed, was surrounded by a dividing wall and was given a cover, so that an additional floor (a so-called hiel, plural: hillen) was created on which extra hay for winter feeding was stored.

The weight of the roof was not carried by the outside walls on this type of building, but by an internal group of posts and beams (Ständerwerk or stååpelwârk).

The roof covering of the living area was traditionally made entirely of red clay tiles. By contrast, the lower one-third of the barn roof was covered with tiles, but the upper two-thirds were thatched. The roof was usually in the shape of a half-hipped roof. Where only one end was half-hipped this was the wind-facing gable end (usually the barn gable). The hip is often surmounted, even today, by a decorative staff or Malljan, a device that echoes the mystical beliefs of earlier times.

One feature of many older gulf farmhouses is the so-called Upkammer (upkååmer), a room in the living quarters, that is higher than the rest of the rooms because it sits above a half-sunken cellar. This can often be recognised from the outside of such buildings by the window arrangement.

The gulf house structure is found, albeit sometimes with major or situation-specific modifications such as a side entrance, both on large farm buildings (plååts) as well as on smaller buildings including farm labourers' houses.

== Other uses ==
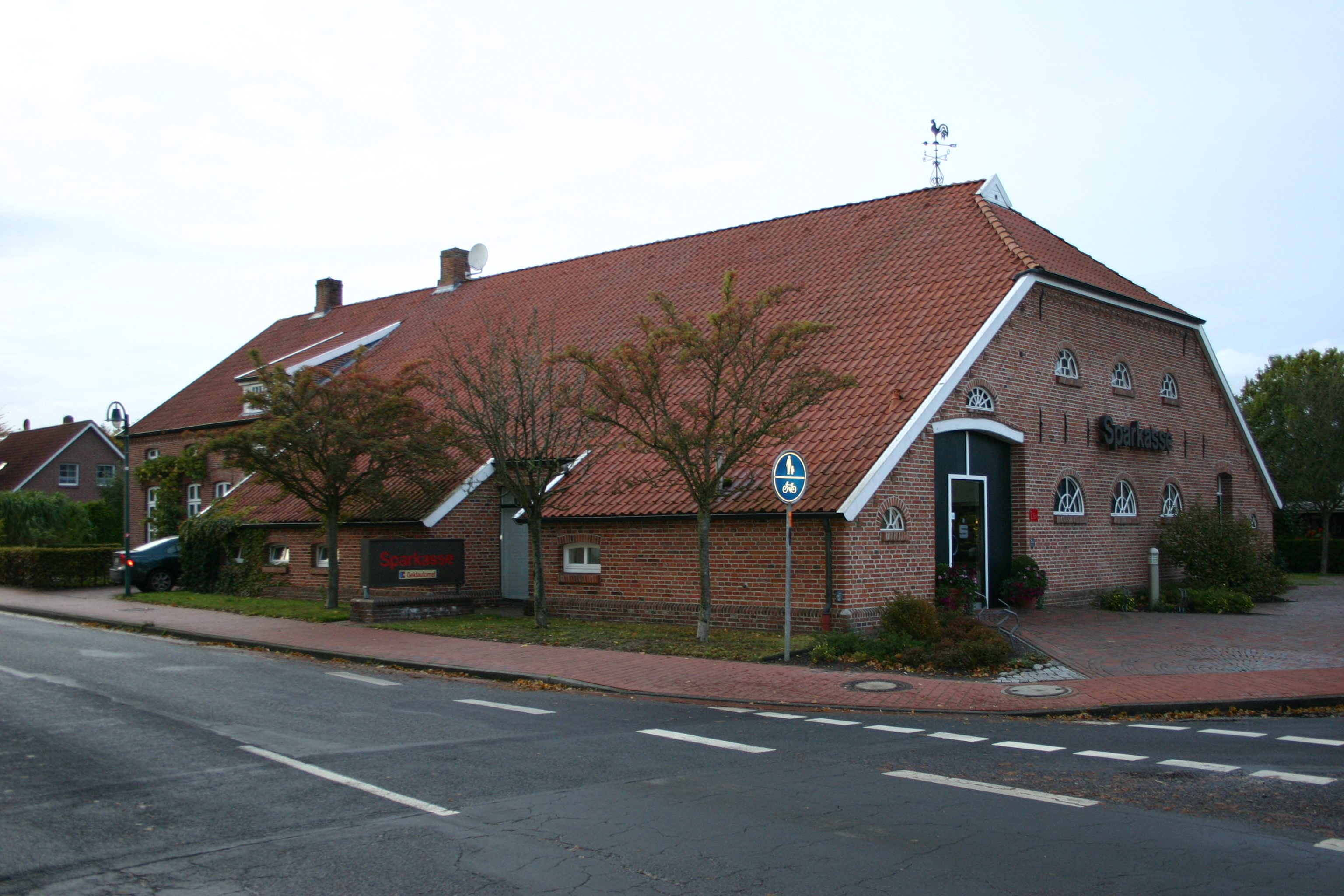
Conversion: a bank in a former gulf farmhouse in Hollen

Traditionally, gulf house constructions were also used for other buildings, e.g. brickworks and warehouses.

The restructuring of agriculture and the closure of farms have provided opportunities for gulf farmhouses to be used for other rural purposes. For example, in Loquard (municipality of Krummhörn, Aurich district) a former gulf farmhouse has been converted into a primary school. In Hollen (municipality of Uplengen, Leer district) the local Sparkasse bank has moved into a former gulf farmhouse. The conservation society, NABU, runs an educational establishment for 'near-natural' farming in a gulf house in Wiegboldsbur (municipality of Südbrookmerland, Aurich).

== See also ==
- Geestharden house
