= Ridge-post framing =

Type of timber framing

Ridge-post framing is an old type of timber framing. The ridge board of their roof is not carried by king posts based on tie beams, but the ridge posts are based on the ground work. The German term for this construction is Firstständerhaus. The free-standing posts in the interior of the house and the posts in the gable or lateral walls were originally called Firstsäule ("ridge columns"). On a purlin roof the ridge posts carry the ridge purlin. On the latter are hung the sloping rafters to which the roof is fixed. This type of Firstständerhaus was predominantly built around the 15th century in Baden region.

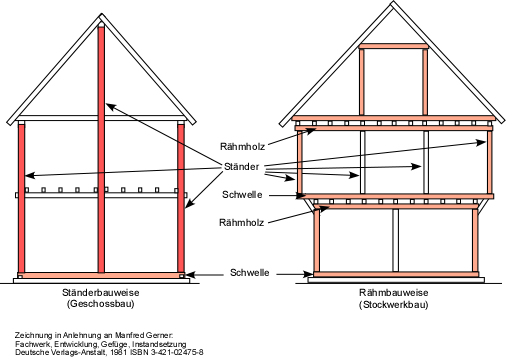
Post construction compared with frame construction: the ridge posts can be seen in the left-hand diagram.

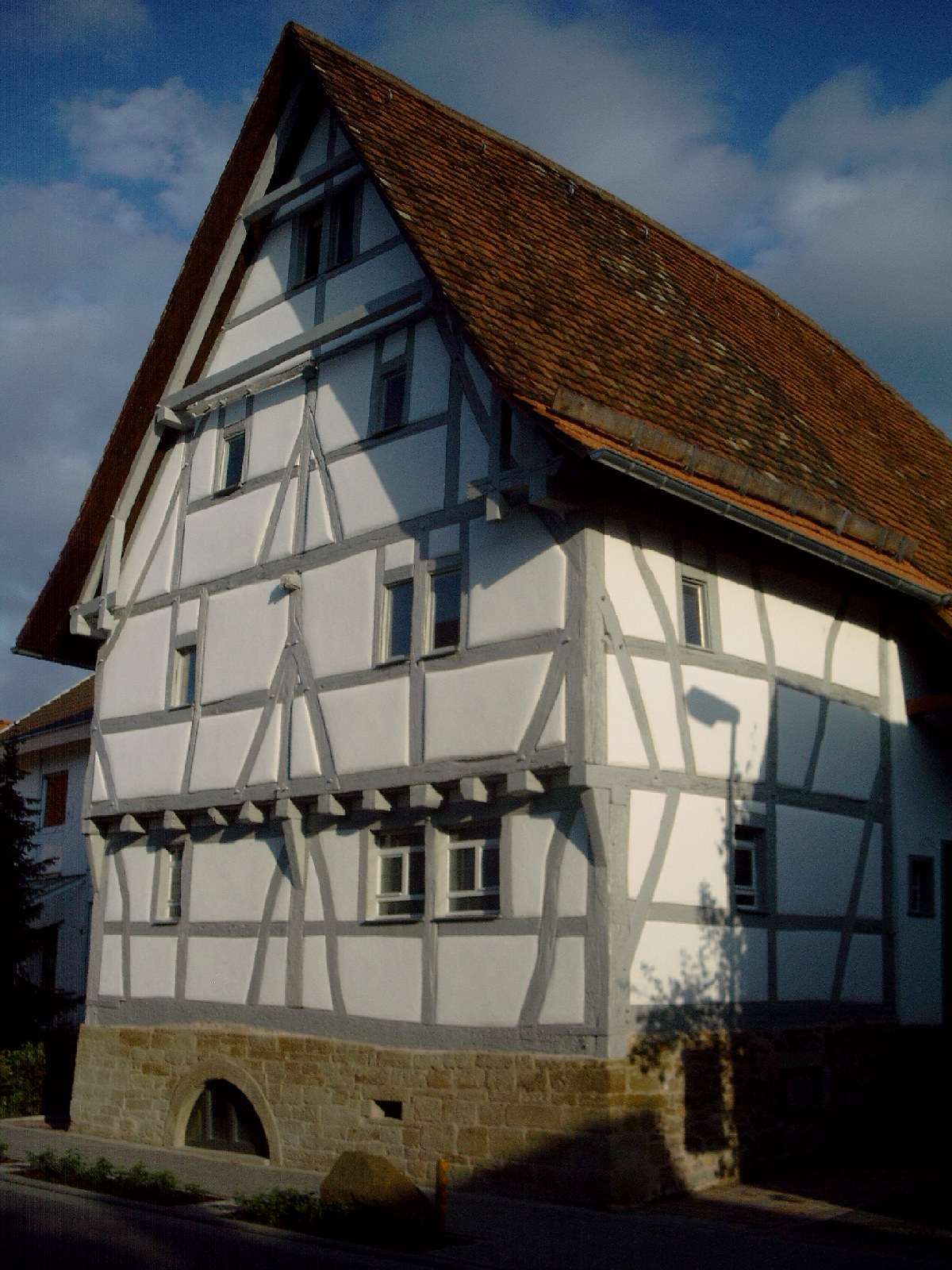
A Firstständerhaus in Zeutern, Baden
