= Linny =

Linny may refer to:

- A type of farm storage building with an open side also spelled linney and linhay; see circular linhay
- Linny the guinea pig, an animated character in the children's television show Wonder Pets!.

== See also ==
- Linney, a list of people with the surname
- Linnie, a list of people with the given name
