= Montafonerhaus =

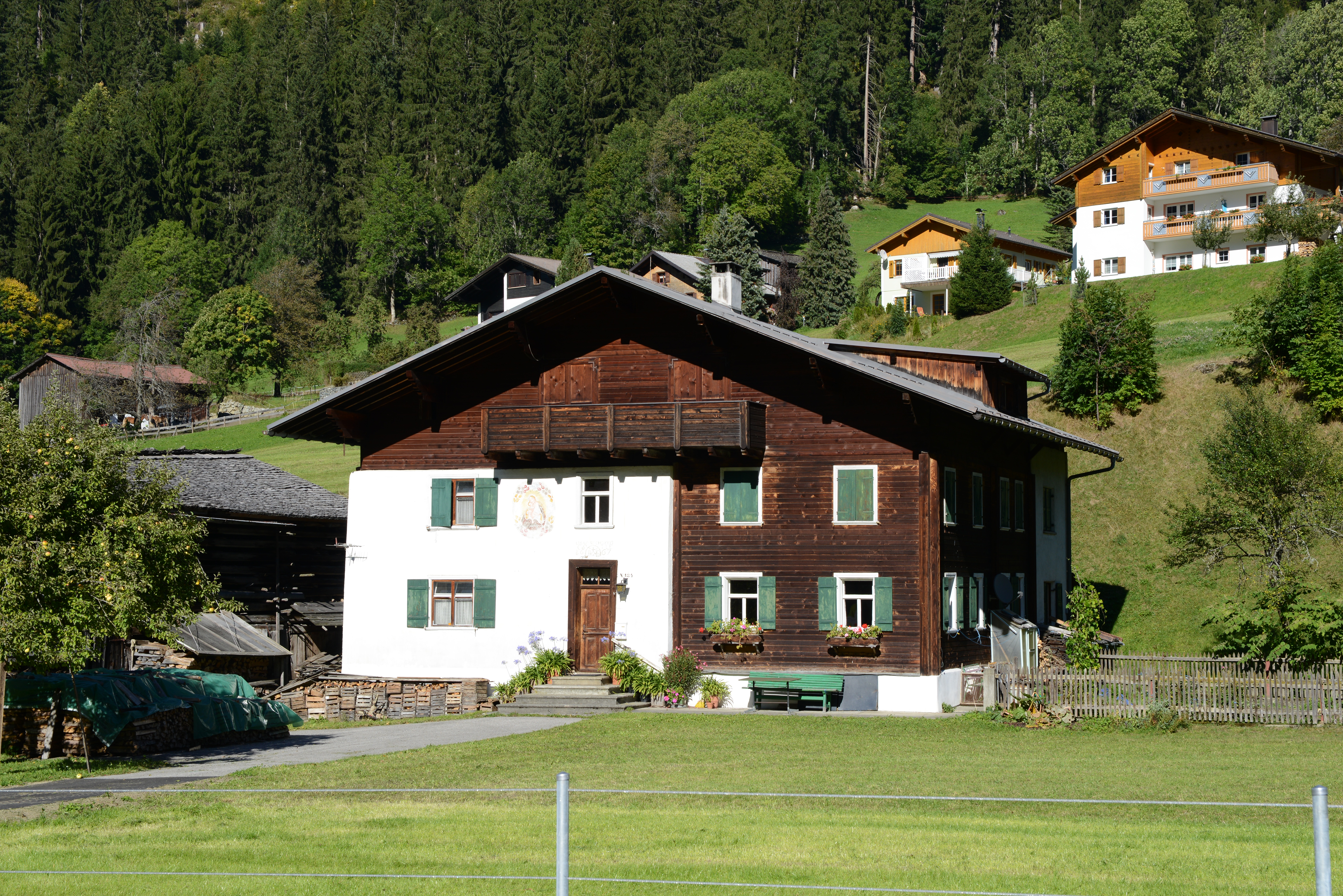
A typical Montafonerhaus in Gaschurn (Vorarlberg)

The Montafonerhaus (or Montafon house) is a house type in the Montafon valley in Vorarlberg (Austria).

It is built as a mixed construction of stone and wood. The Montafonerhaus was a popular type of house from the 15th to the 20th century. These spacious buildings characterize the landscape in the Montafon valley until today.

In all of Austria and the entire Alpine region, the Montafon is the only valley that is so small that it has its own type of house. The individual houses differ depending on the wealth of the builder, the location and the architectural fashion at the time the house was built.

== History ==
In the Montafon, the Rhaeto-Romanic stone house (which had its origins in Graubünden) and the wooden Walser house (originating in Valais) developed into its own form of house in a mixed stone-wood construction. Wood from local forests has always played a central role in the choice of material. Most Montafon houses have been built between 1670 and 1960.

Settlement form

The Montafon was not originally designed as a village structure. Instead, the valley consisted of single farm settlements. These were created at the time the forest was first cleared. A special feature of the Montafon valley is the lack of hedges in the entire valley.

== The design ==
The Montafonerhaus is a so-called Paarhof. This means that the house and the stable or other additional buildings (e.g., for equipment storage) are separated. In contrast to this, the Bregenzerwälderhaus is a Einhof (byre-dwelling) which means that the house and stable are both under one roof.

From a functional point of view, Montafon houses were mostly multi-generational houses that also integrated the agricultural part.

=== Types ===
There are two basic types, depending on where the entrance door is located: in type I it is in the valley-facing gable wall, in type II the entrance is on the side of the eaves sheltered from the wind.

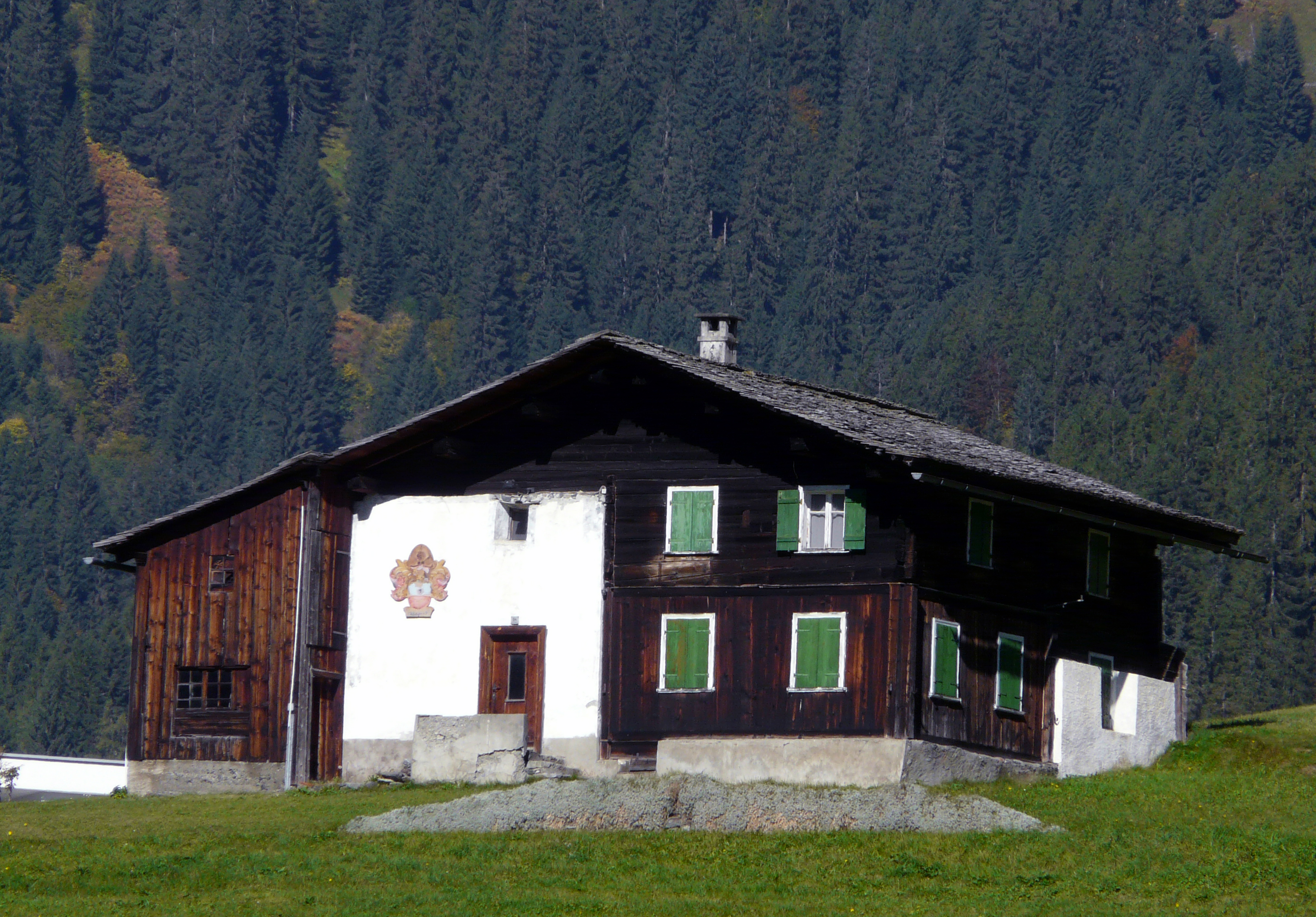
Montafonerhaus, type I, in Gortipohl

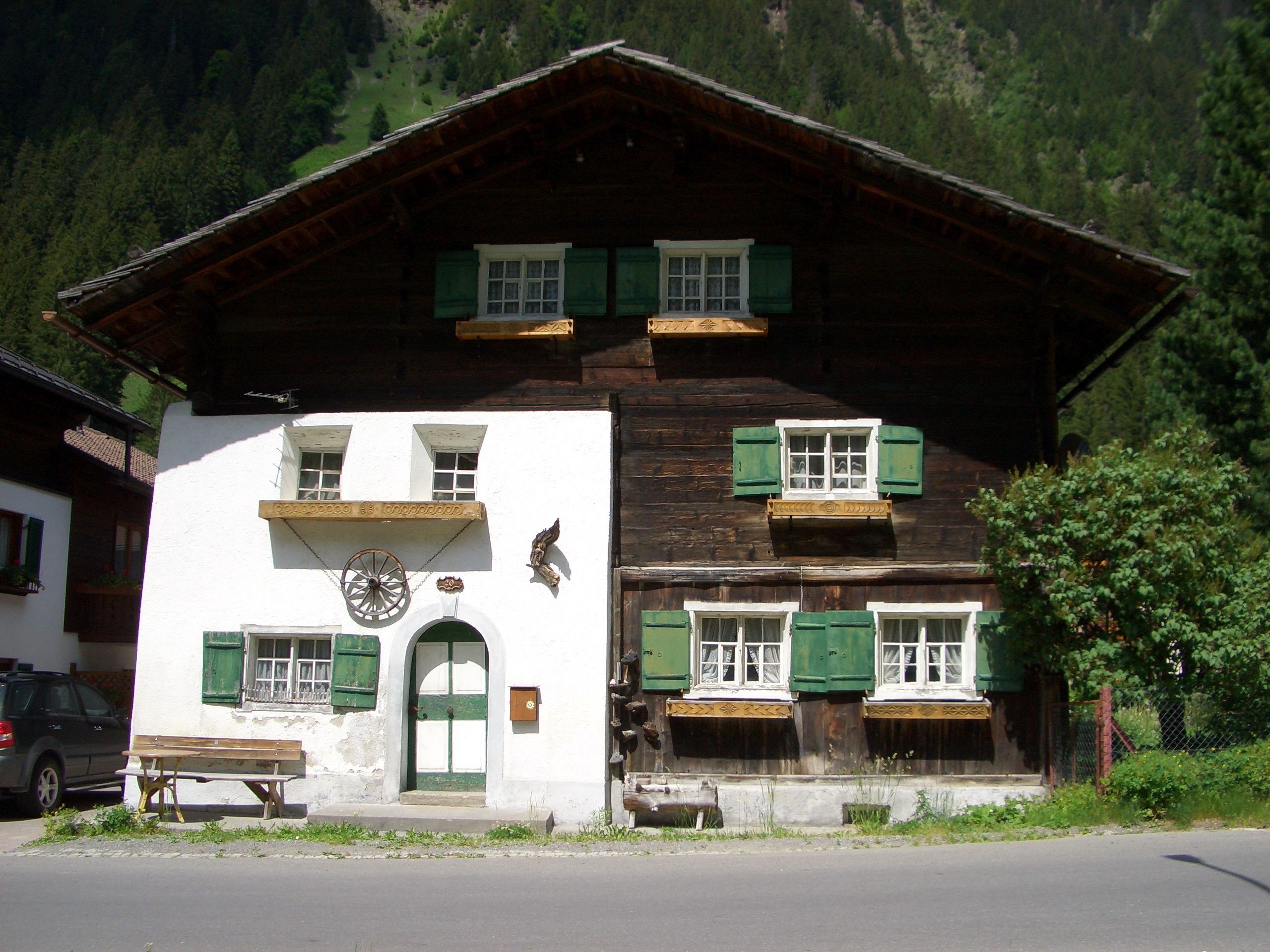
Type I Montafonerhaus in Partenen (Gaschurn)

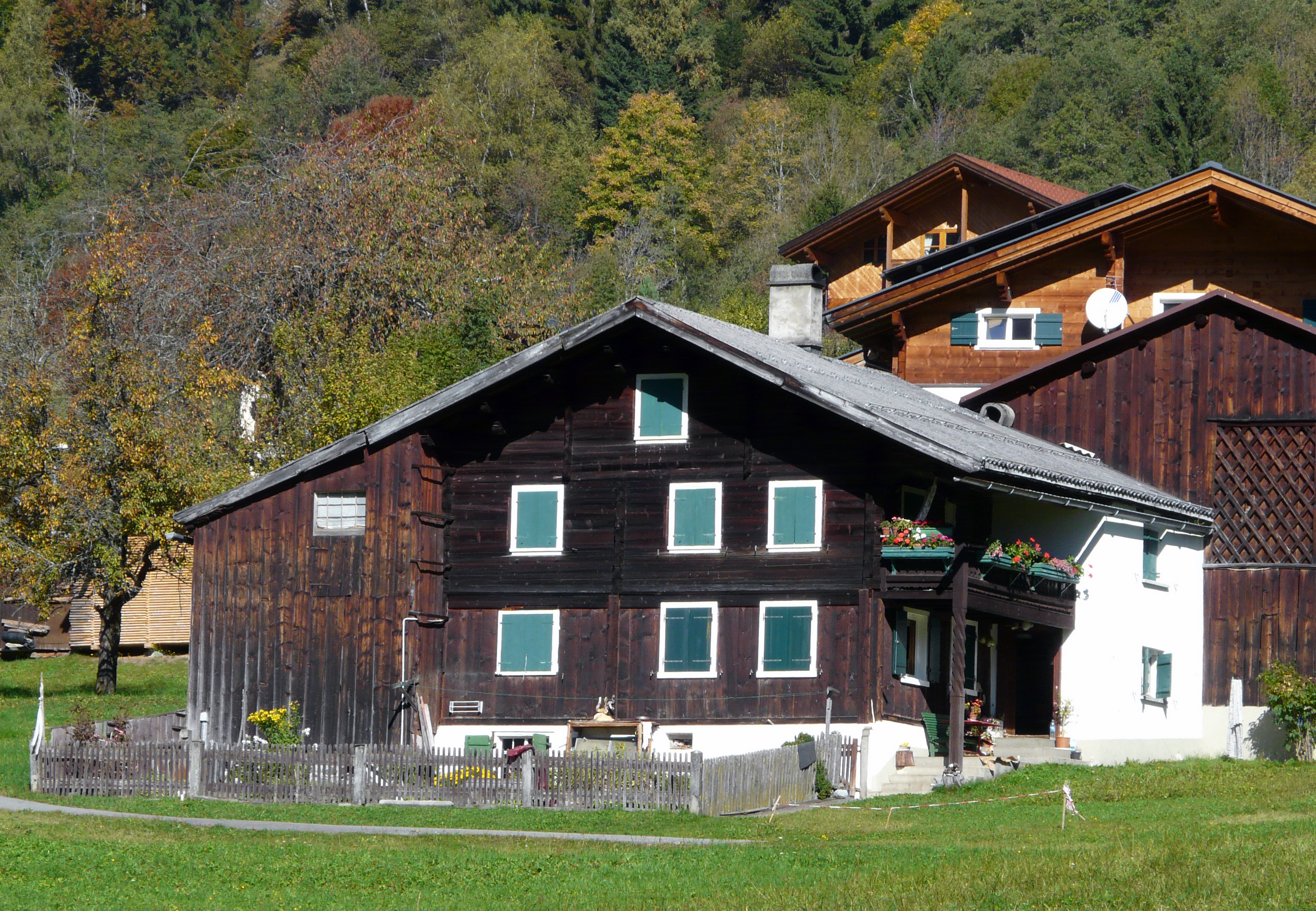
Montafonerhaus, type II, in Gortipohl

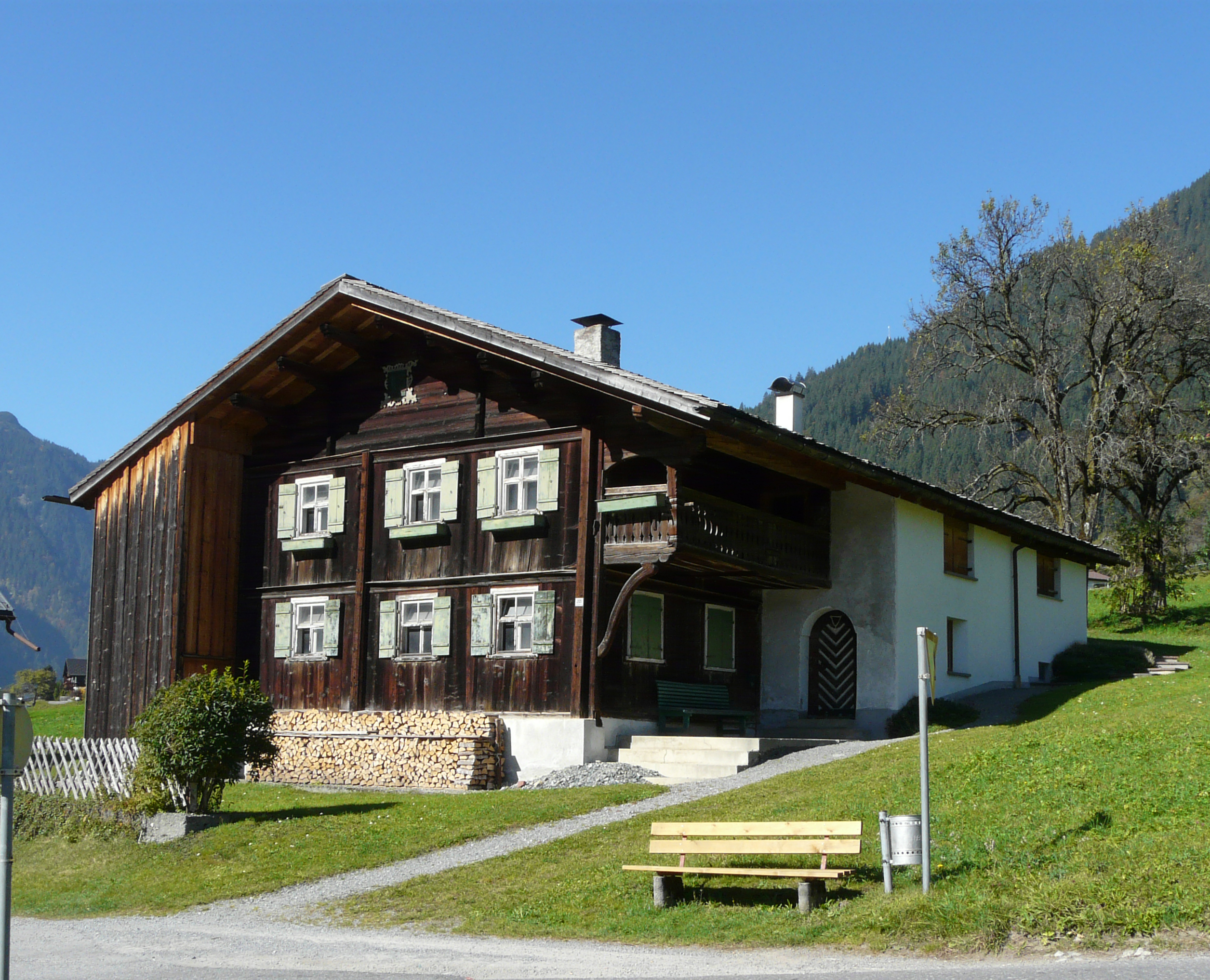
Montafonerhaus, type II, in St. Gallenkirch

=== The interior layout of the Montafonerhaus ===
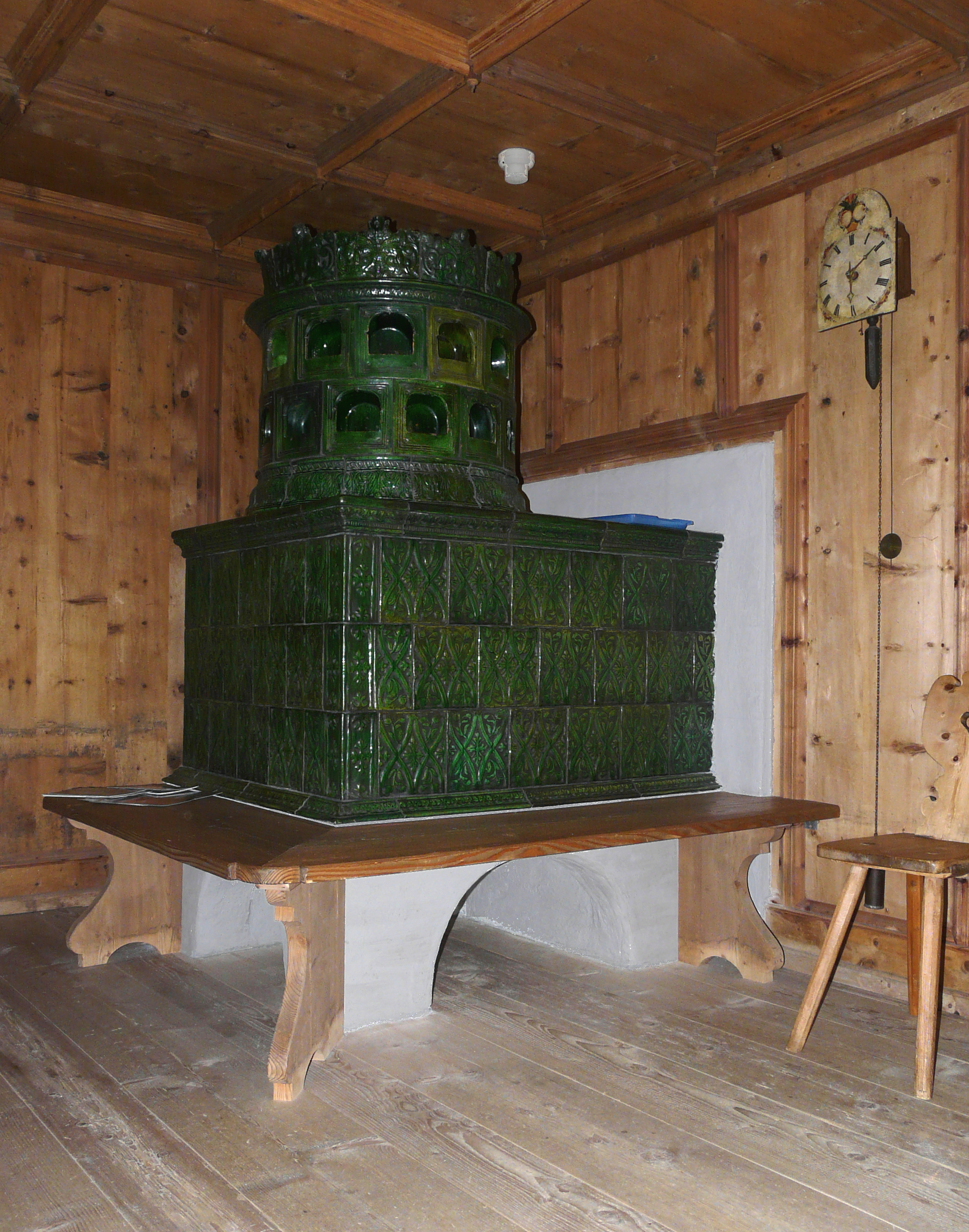
Green tiled stove in the Lukas-Tschofen-Stube in Gaschurn

From the outside, the whitewashed walls form a clear contrast to the black and brown wooden walls. The flat roof is a snow roof with a pitch of 23 to 25 degrees and was originally a clapboard. A snow roof is inclined so gently that the snow stays on the roof as heat insulation and does not slide off as a roof avalanche.

The wall with the entrance door (usually in the form of a round arch) and the rooms behind it (front house and kitchen) are made of stone, the rest of the house has wooden walls.

The house is heated by a central tiled stove, which is supplemented in the parlor (Stoba) by a brick bench, the so-called Kuschbank, permeated with the warm smoke by the stove. In the living room, there is usually also a so-called Herrgottswinkel (Jesus on the cross in the corner, to the right and left of it pictures of Mary and Joseph) with a Montafon table, corner bench and chairs. The living room often has a coffered ceiling and the walls are wood paneled.

On the bad-weather side of the Montafonerhaus, there is a tuft of boarded half-timbering; it is often pulled forward to keep out drafts. Near the entrance, in a sheltered sunny spot, there is often a resting place with a bench, the so-called Bsetzi.

==== The Montafon table ====
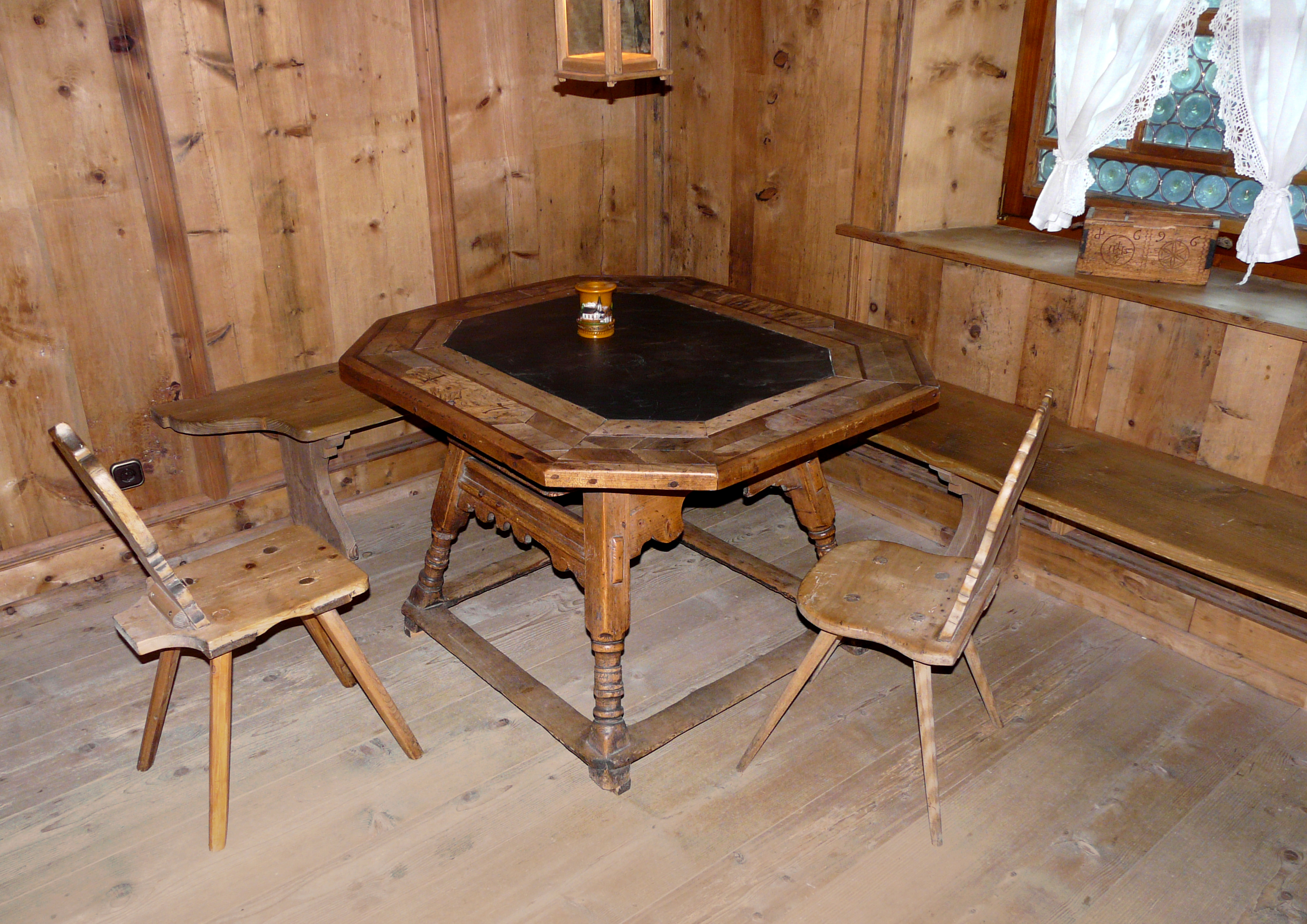
Sitting area with corner bench, two chairs and Montafon table in the Lukas-Tschofen-Stube in Gaschurn

The Montafon table was a typical piece of furniture in a Montafonerhaus. This has an inlaid octagonal (4 broken corners) table top with a slate inlaid in the centre and stands on sloping feet. The slate was used to put down hot pots and as a writing board for the card game Jassen. The Montafon table includes a corner seat, chairs and a Herrgottswinkel above the corner seat with a cross and two votive images.

Montafon tables are one-of-a-kind pieces that are still, although rarely, made today by dedicated carpenters. Local woods such as pear, cherry, oak, beech, nut, elm and maple have been stored and air-dried for up to 25 years before being processed. More than 100 hours of work have gone into each of these pieces, whose wood decorations can be selected by the customer himself.

=== Additional buildings ===
There is often a small herb and vegetable garden close to the house, which is secured with a fence against cattle and game. The hay barn, built almost entirely of wood, is 10 to 20 m from the house; both together they form a so-called pair farm (stable and house are next to or against each other, in avalanche areas also one behind the other). The barn is usually larger and more exposed than the house, so that the house is more sheltered from the wind and the hay in the barn can continue to dry with the wind.

There is often a Selch (smokehouse) nearby, a small wooden shed for smoking.

== Photo gallery ==
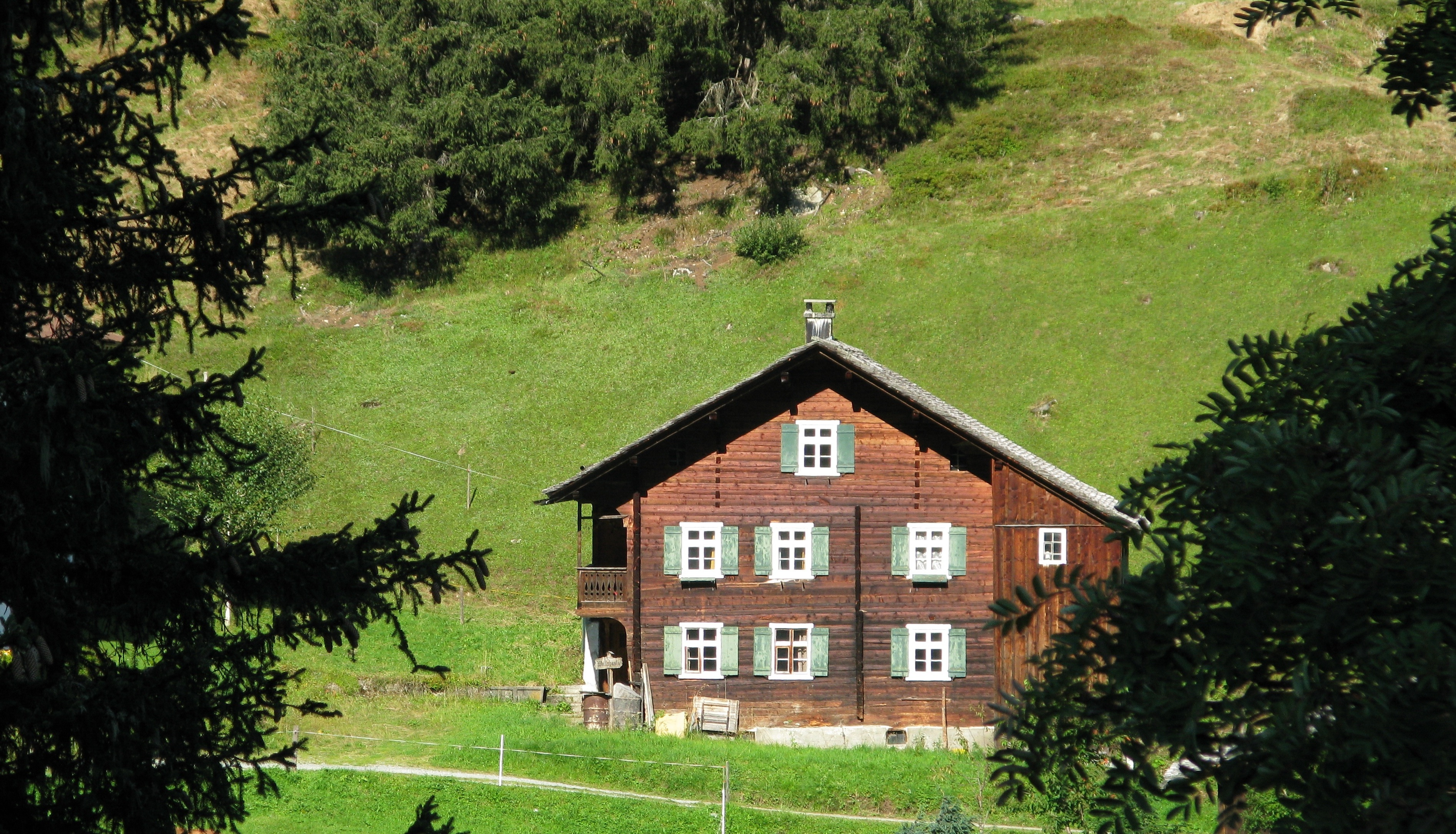
Montafon house in the Gargellen mountains

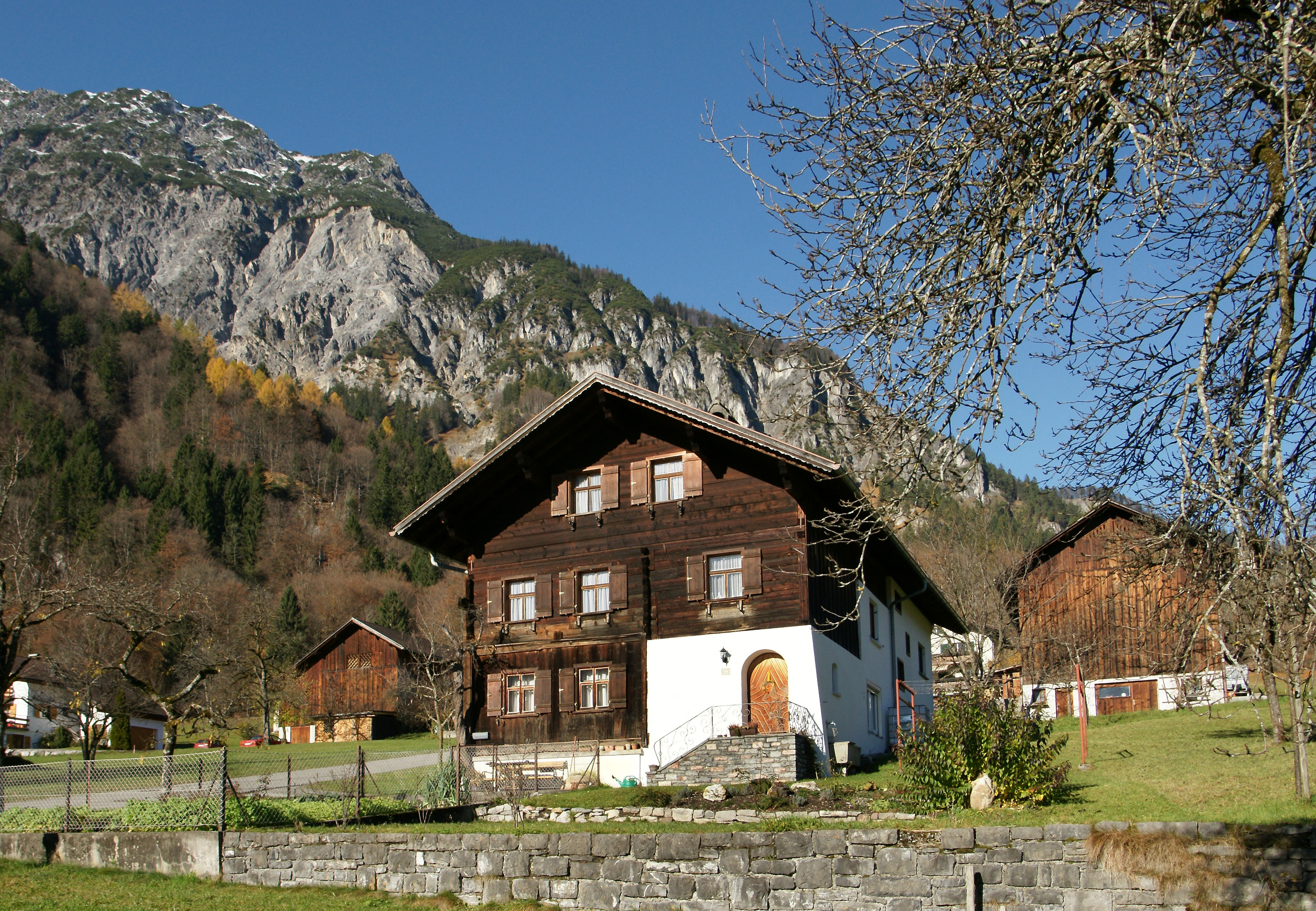
Type I Montafonerhaus in Vandans

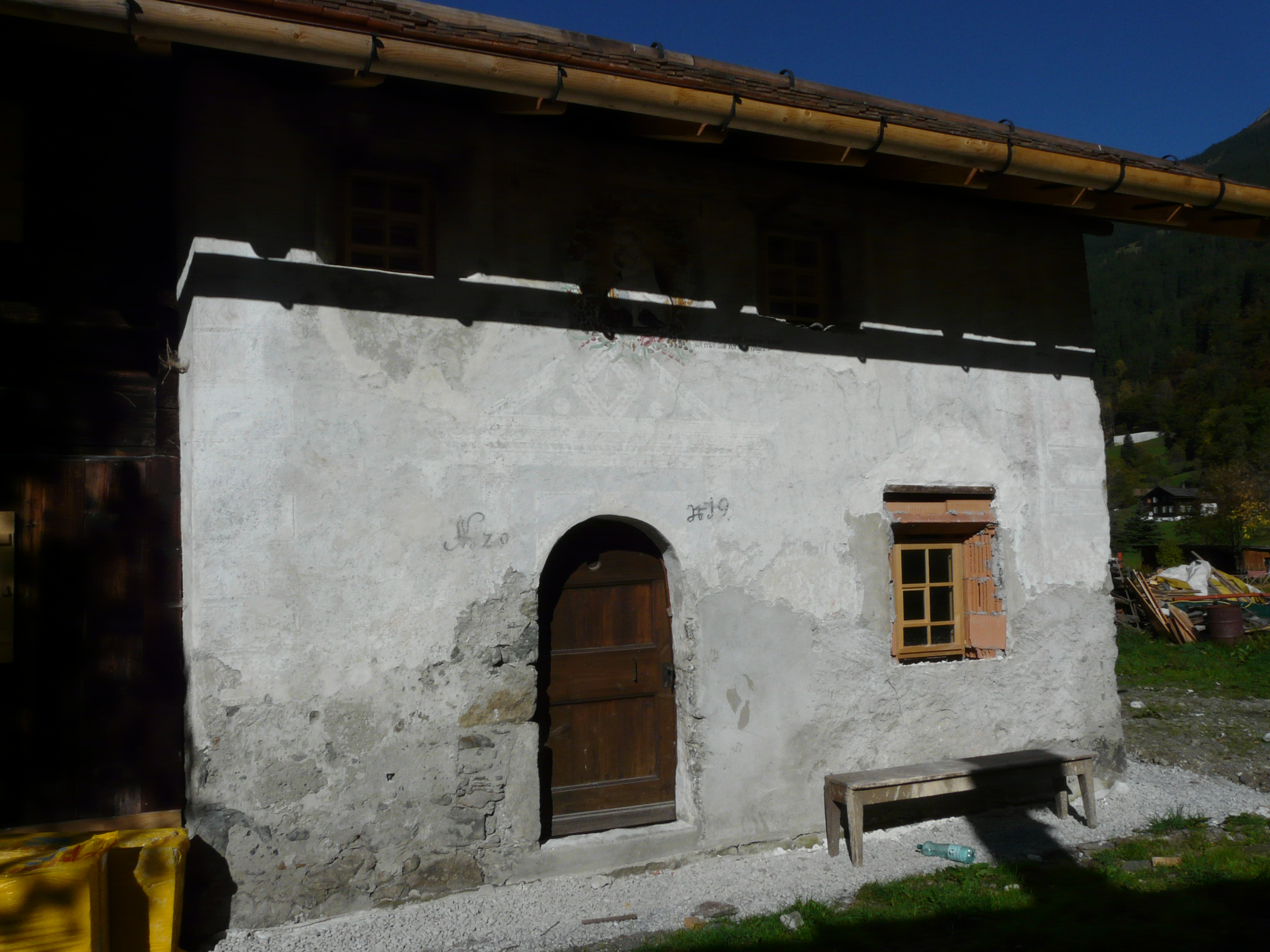
Entrance area of a Montafonerhaus in Gortipohl (2010)

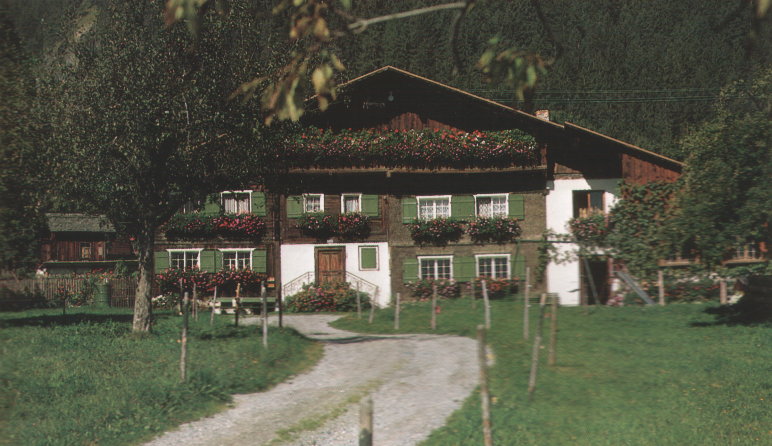
Montafonerhaus in 2006

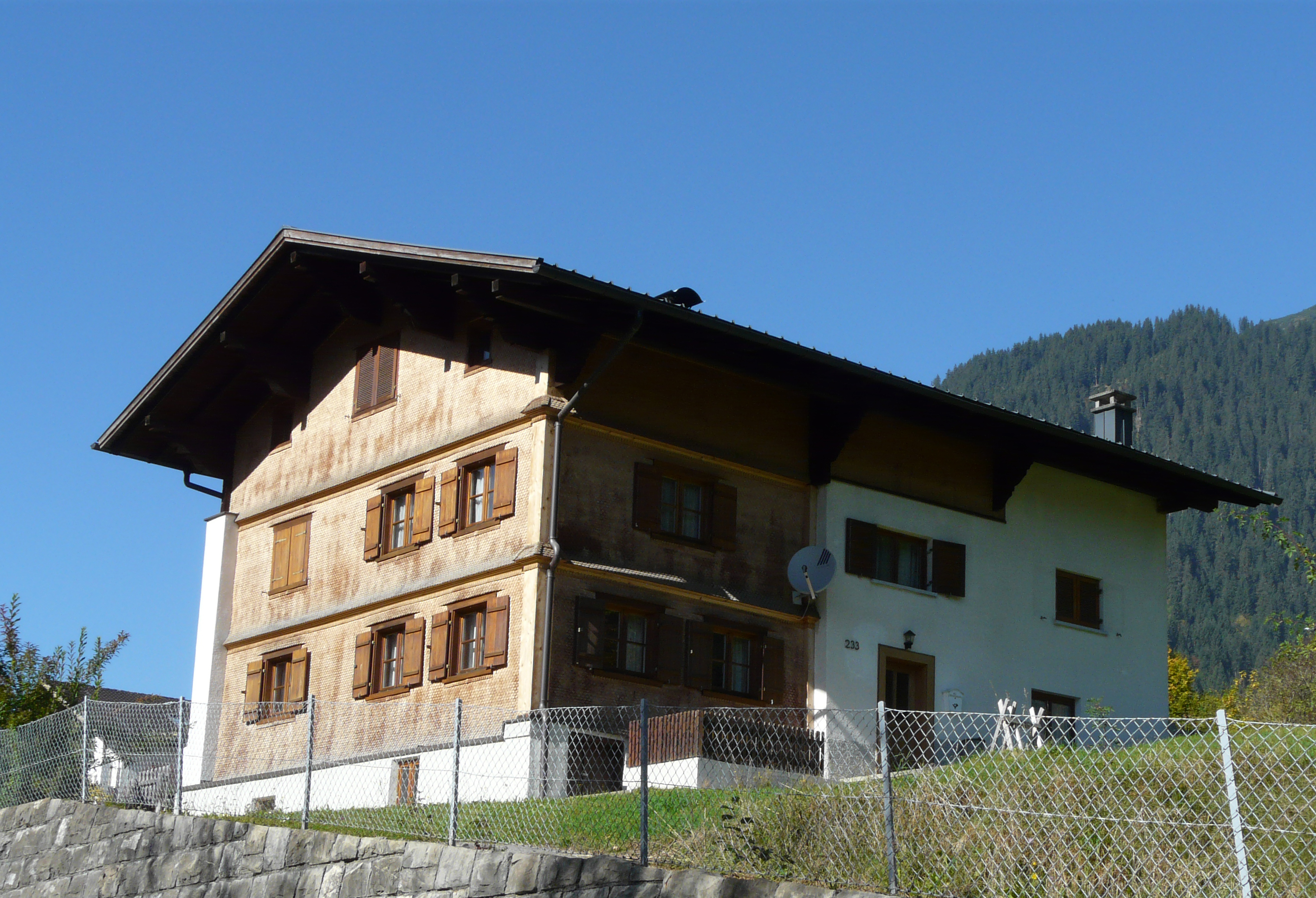
Montafonerhaus in St. Gallenkirch

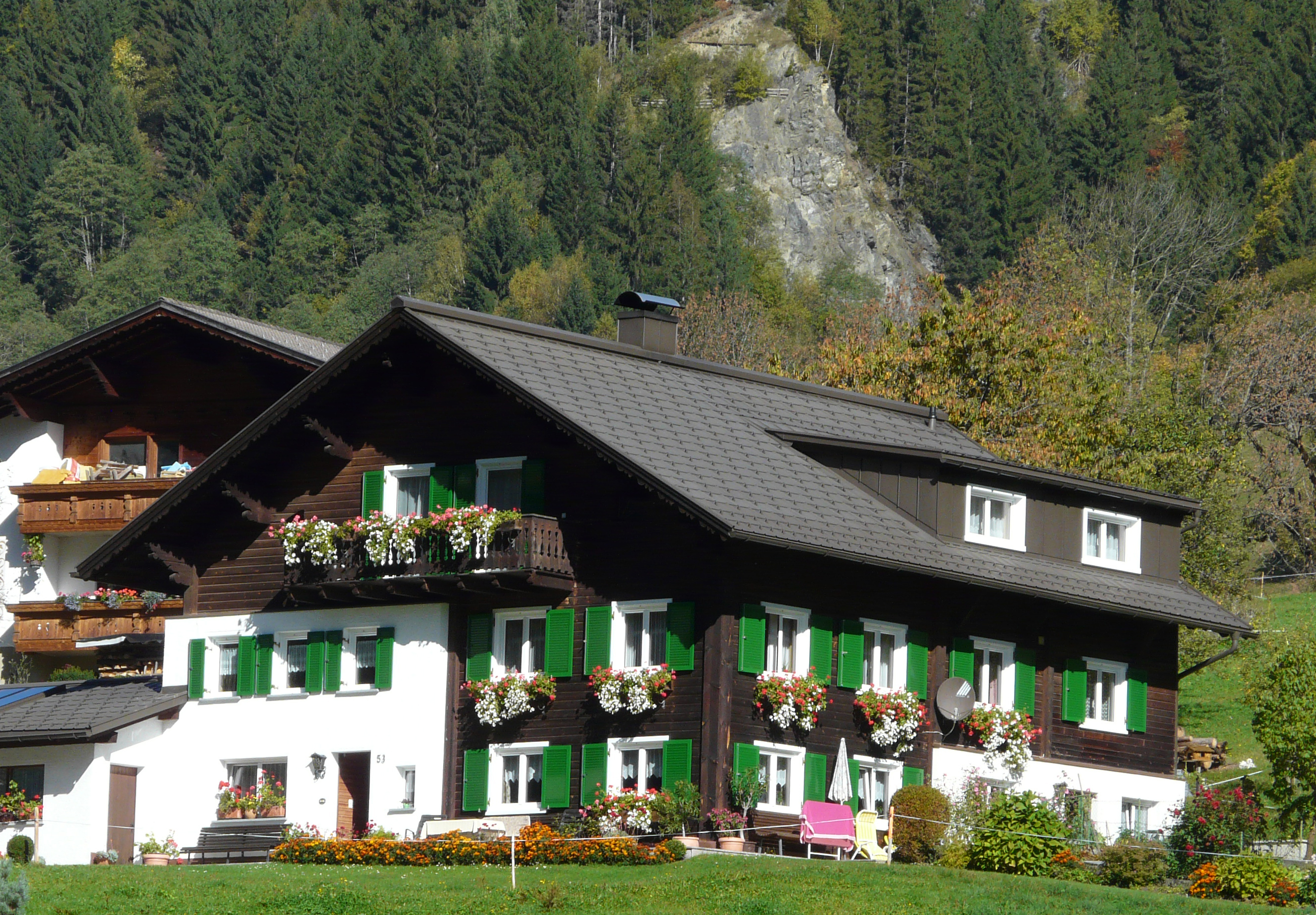
Montafonerhaus in Gortipohl

== See also ==
- Bregenzerwälderhaus
- Housebarn

== Sources ==
- Friedl Haas: "Das Montafonerhaus und sein Stall". Montafoner Schriftenreihe 3., published in Bludenz in 2001 (see digitalised version in German)
