= Linney =

Linney is an English surname. Notable people with the surname include:

- Caitlin Linney, American trance vocalist and singer-songwriter
- Dave Linney (born 1961), English footballer
- George Linney (1869–1927), English-born Australian cricketer, father of Keith Linney
- Keith Linney (1912–1992), Australian-born English cricketer
- Laura Linney (born 1964), American actress of film, television and theatre
- Romulus Linney (playwright) (1930–2011), American playwright and professor
- Romulus Zachariah Linney (1841–1910), Republican U.S. Congressman from North Carolina 1895–1901

== See also ==
- Linney (linny, linhay) is also a type of farm storage building with an open side and an unusual form: circular linhay
- Lunney
