= Kuney =

Kuney is a surname. Notable people with the surname include:

- Amy Kuney (born 1985), American singer, songwriter, and musician
- Eva Lee Kuney (1934–2015), American actress, dancer, and draftswoman

== See also ==
- Luney
