= Byre-dwelling =

Combined shelter for humans and livestock

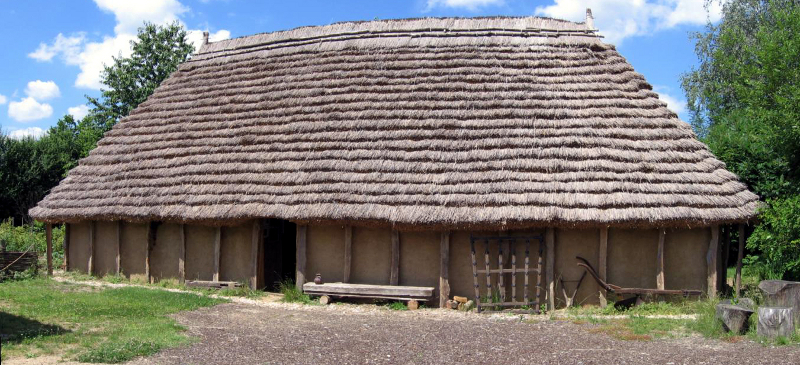
A reconstruction

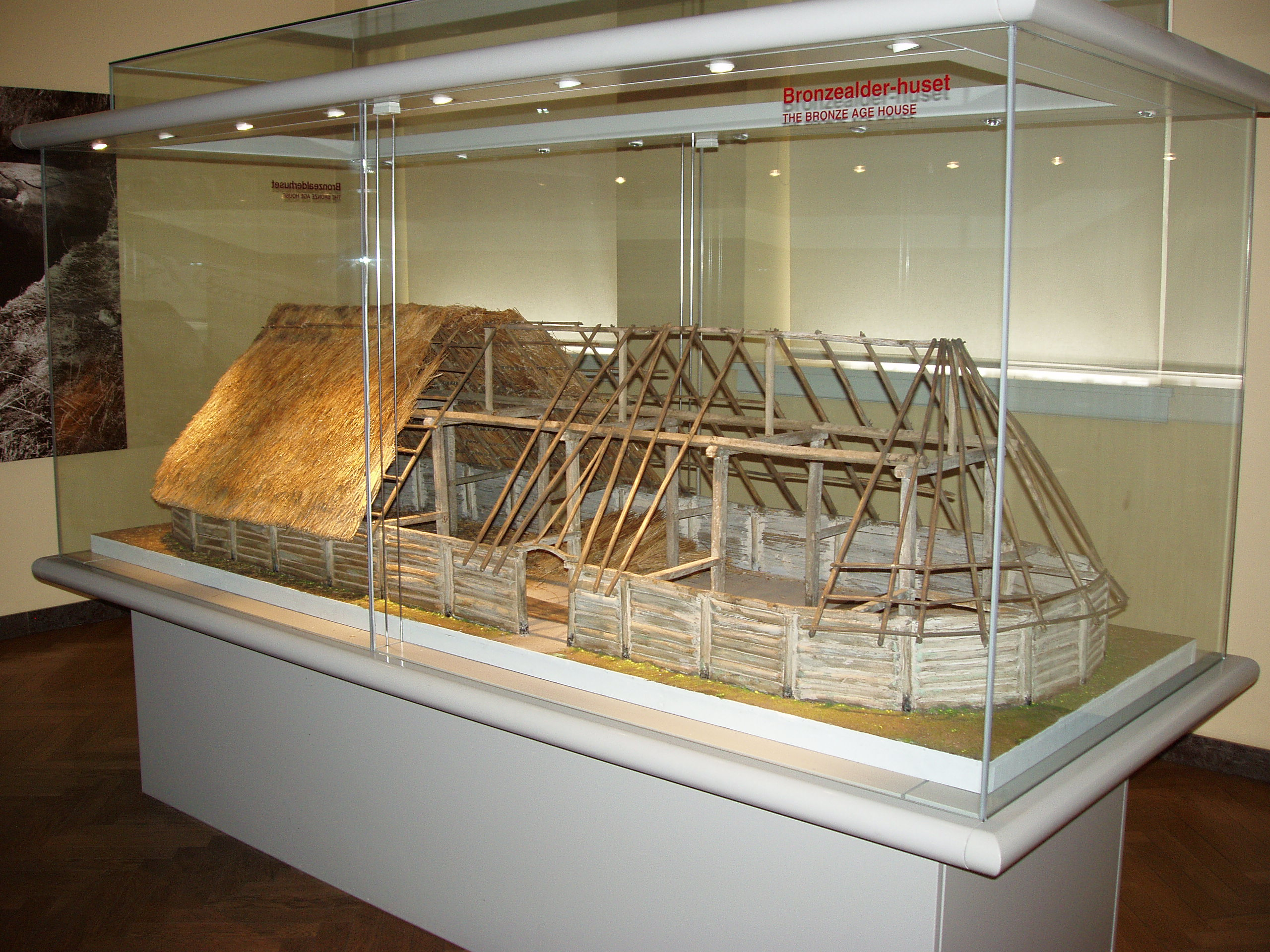
A model

A byre-dwelling is a farmhouse in which the living quarters are combined with the livestock and/or grain barn under the same roof. In the latter case, the building is also called a housebarn in American English.

This kind of construction is found in archaeological sites in northwestern Europe from the Bronze Age. It was also used in more modern times by Mennonites, originating from the Netherlands.

== Distribution ==
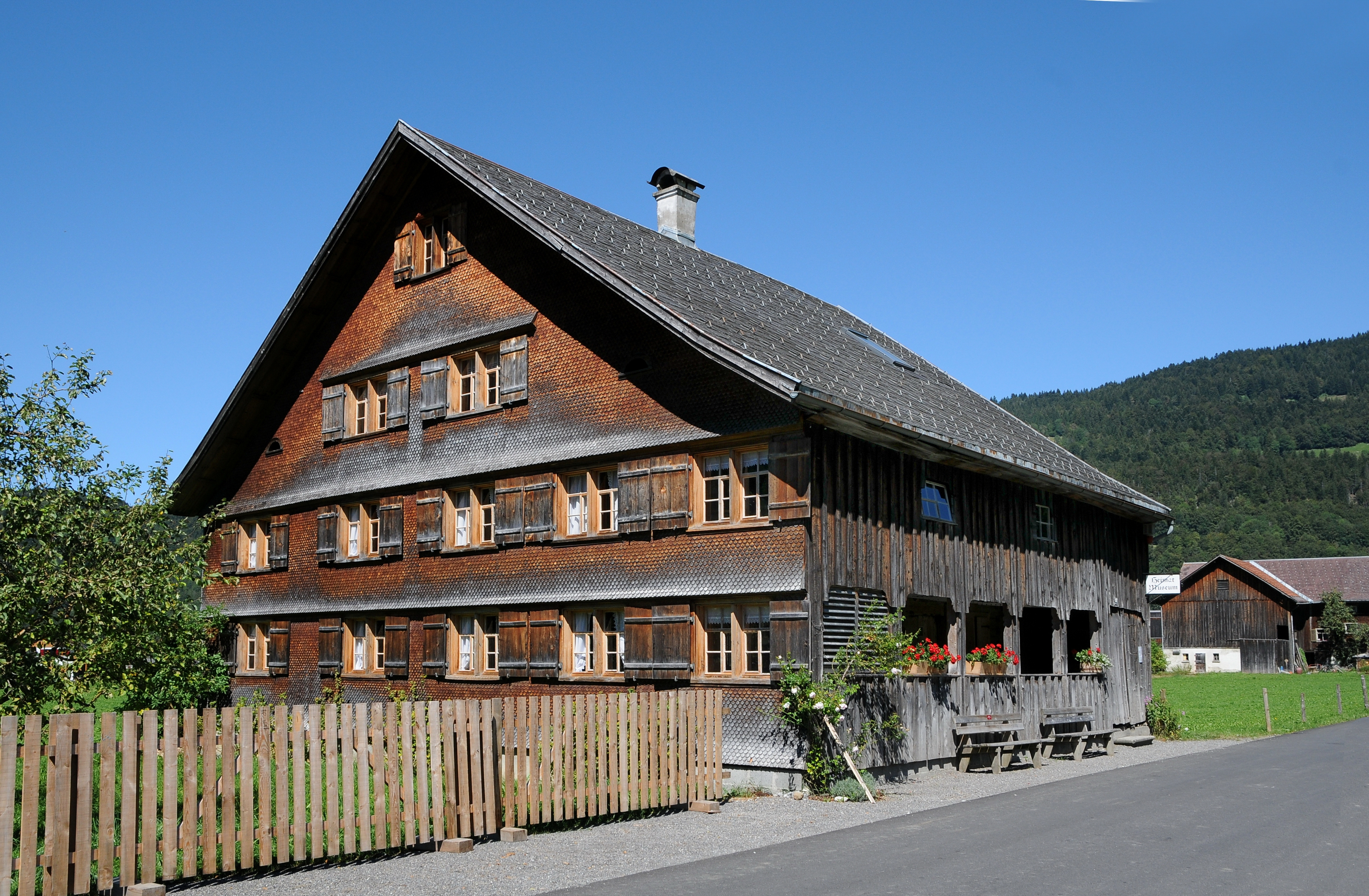
Bregenzerwälderhaus in Bezau, Vorarlberg (Austria)

=== Austria ===
The Bregenzerwälderhaus from the Bregenz Forest in Vorarlberg is an example for a byre-dwelling. The stable and the usually two-storey house are under one roof.

=== Germany ===
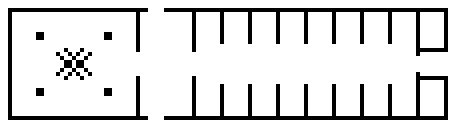
Schematic diagram of an iron age byre-dwelling based on excavations on the Feddersen Wierde

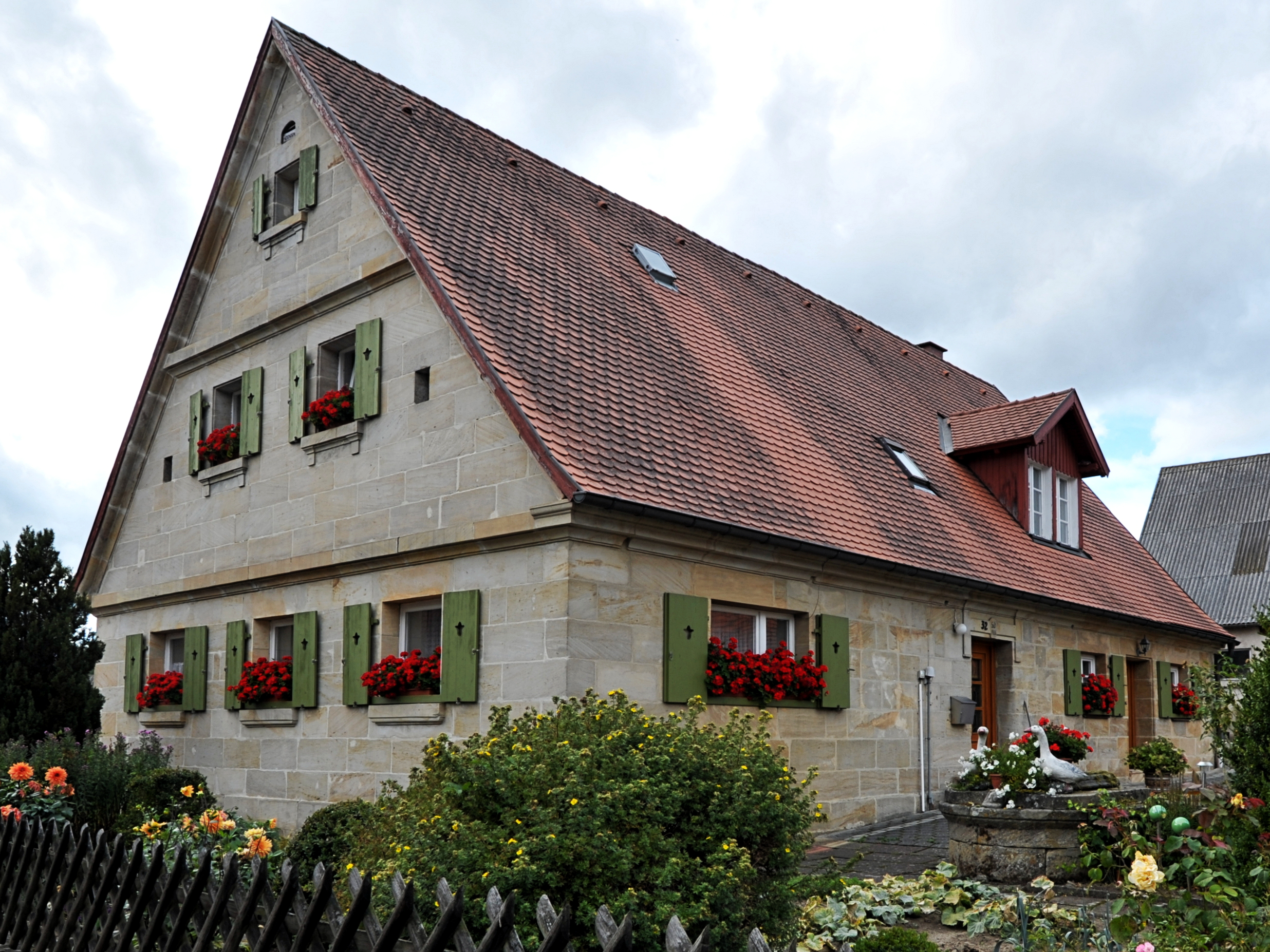
Modern era byre-dwelling in Bavaria (Eckersdorf, Upper Franconia), list of cultural monuments of Bayern, no. D-4-72-131-24.

The generic German term is Wohnstallhaus from Wohnung ("dwelling"), Stall ("byre", "sty)" and Haus ("house").

From the Iron Age onwards the longhouse, developed from the byre-dwellings of the Bronze Age with its domestic area and adjacent cattle bays, was found across the North German Plain. As a result of the keeping of ever larger herds of cattle, these buildings became longer. Examples of such Iron Age longhouses were first excavated in large numbers on the warft of Feddersen Wierde near the German North Sea coastal town of Cuxhaven. Since then, this type of house has been found from Holland to South Jutland (for its construction see the post in ground article).

The variation of the hall house known as the Low Saxon house (Niedersachsenhaus) was developed from the longhouse. This type of dwelling is distributed across the North German Plain from the Netherlands to the Bay of Gdansk (Danzig) and bounded in the south by the Central Uplands.

To the south of this region is found the Middle German house (Ernhaus) which also occurs as a byre-dwelling and was found in many sub-variants from the Rhine to the far side of the River Vistula. Early on this type was developed into variants that separated the various functions. For example, the functions of cattle shed and barn were later transferred to separate buildings or had never been part of the domestic building at all.

Two-storey byre-dwellings with stone walled ground floors occurred in the northeast of Baden-Württemberg in the 15th century. They were described as Pastor Mayer houses (Pfarrer-Mayer-Häuser).

The Black Forest house is probably a more recent development of a byre-dwelling, whereby the functions (especially on hillsides) were also divided over two floors. Likewise the Haubarg in North Frisia is a recent development of the Early Modern Period from the East Frisian Gulfhaus.

=== Switzerland ===
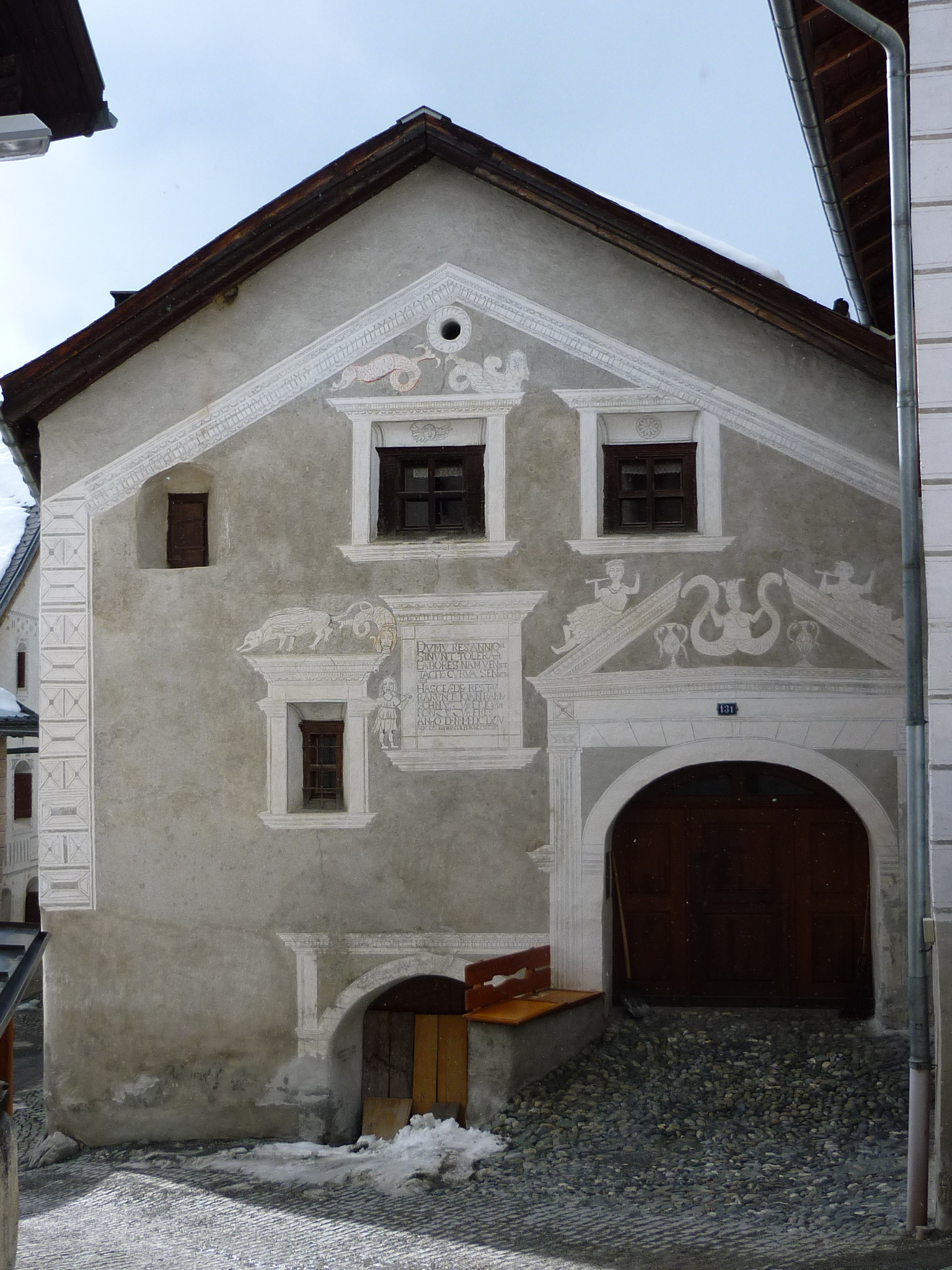
Engadine house in Ardez

The Engadine house which emerged in the 15th/16th centuries, especially in the Engadine, is a typical byre-dwelling. It is a solid, stone building, usually with a wooden core, which comprises domestic and working areas, one behind the other, under a single, broad saddle roof. The domestic and working areas cover three storeys, with a gate on the lower and ground floors. On the lower floor is the byre (Stallhof or Cuort) with access to the cattle bays and cellars. At the front of the ground floor storey is the vestibule (Sulèr, pietan) leading to the living quarters: the parlour (Stube), kitchen (Küche), larder (Vorratskammer) and, at the back, the barn (Scheune) for the hay. A haycart (Heukarren, tragliun) could only be taken through the upper gate or the vestibule into the barn. On the upper storey (Palatschin) are the bedrooms. The sitting room has the only stove, which heated the living quarters from the kitchen outwards. While the division of the rooms and the position of the windows and oriels (with their view of the well) were based mainly on practical considerations, the facades of Engadine houses were often richly decorated with murals and sgraffiti.

For centuries, Engadine houses dominated the scene in the Engadine villages of Ardez, Guarda, Zuoz, La Punt etc., where they were grouped around a common well as a village quarter that formed a Romanesque cooperative farming organisation.

=== British Isles ===
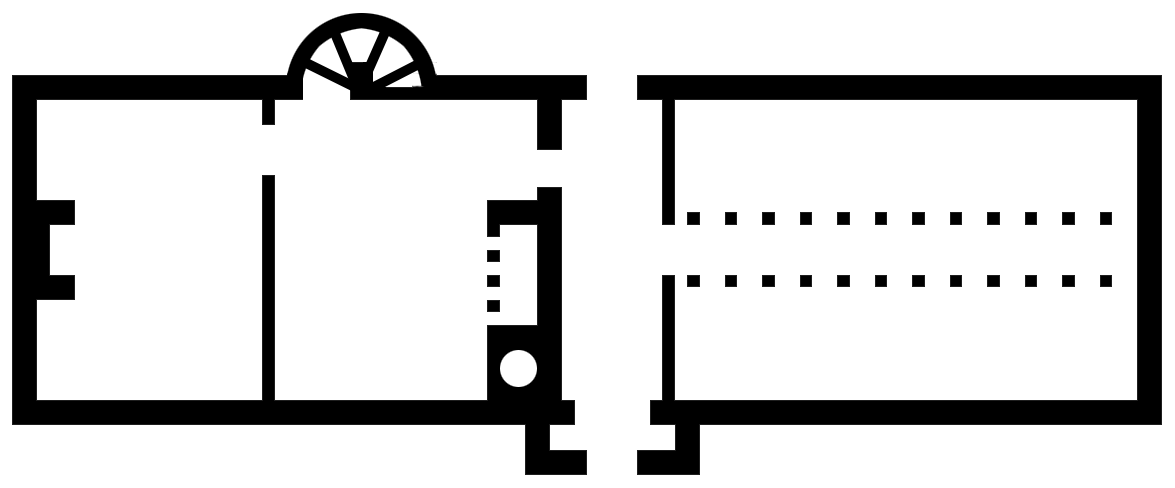
The plan of a typical Dartmoor longhouse

In England too, there was a very similar type of dwelling, of which remains survive in the southwest, for example in the longhouse variants of Dartmoor, in Cornwall or in Wales. In Ireland there are similar byre-dwellings, albeit the fireplace here appears to have been placed against a gable wall. In northwestern England this type of dwelling is also described in the Cumbrian countryside.

=== Arabia ===
Compared are the Yemeni towerhouses, in which the ground floor was reserved for animals, with dwellings on higher floors.

== See also ==
- Grubenhaus
- Linhay
- Low German house
- Middle German house
