= Linnie =

Linnie is a feminine given name which may refer to:

- Linnie Belcher, a member of the R&B girl group Allure
- Linnie Findlay (1919–2009), American writer and historian
- Linnie Haggard, to whom Abraham Lincoln dedicated a short poem - See Poetry of Abraham Lincoln
- Linnie Paterson, a singer with the Scottish progressive rock band Beggars Opera in 1973
- Linnie Marsh Wolfe (1881–1945), American librarian

== See also ==
- Linny (disambiguation)
- Linney, a list of people with the surname
