= Lunney =

Lunney is an Irish surname from Ulster. It is an anglicisation of Ó Luinigh.

== List of people with the surname ==
- Barry Lunney Jr. (born 1974), American football coach
- Bryan Lunney (born 1966), American aerospace engineer and former NASA flight director.
- Glynn Lunney (1936–2021), American NASA engineer
- James Lunney (born 1951), Canadian politician
- Jonathan Lunney (born 1998), Irish footballer
- Kevin Lunney, Irish kidnapping victim

== See also ==
- Looney (surname)
- Luney
- Lunney v. Prodigy Services Co.
- Linney
