= Bregenzerwälderhaus =

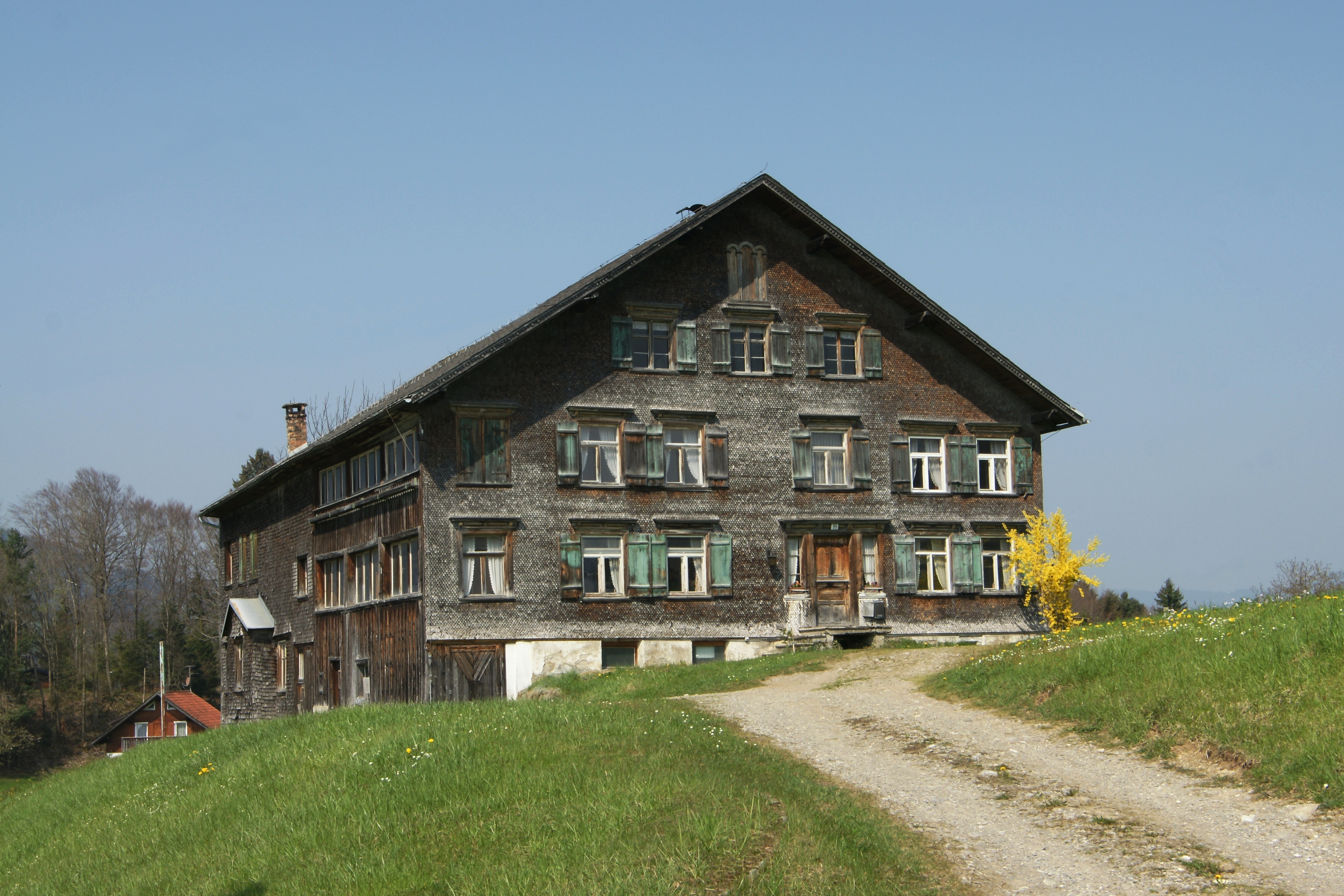
A Bregenzerwälderhaus in Lingenau in the Bregenz Forest

The Bregenzerwälderhaus, Bregenzerwaldhaus or Wälderhaus ("Bregenz Forest house") is a house type from the Bregenz Forest region in Vorarlberg (Austria).

It is a log building with a gable roof which combines residential and agricultural living (working and living areas under one roof). This house type still characterises the landscape of the Bregenz Forest.

== The design ==
The Bregenzerwald farmhouse is a byre-dwelling. The stable and the usually two-storey house are under one roof. The functions of living, animal husbandry, storage and equipment storage are combined in a uniform structure. It is thus characterised as a so-called Einhof which is common in western Austria. This distinguishes it from the Paarhof or Gruppenhof, in which the residential building, barn (storage and storage of equipment) and stable are housed in separate structures. In this regard, the Bregenzerwälderhaus (Einhof) differs from the Montafonerhaus (Paarhof).

=== Interior layout ===
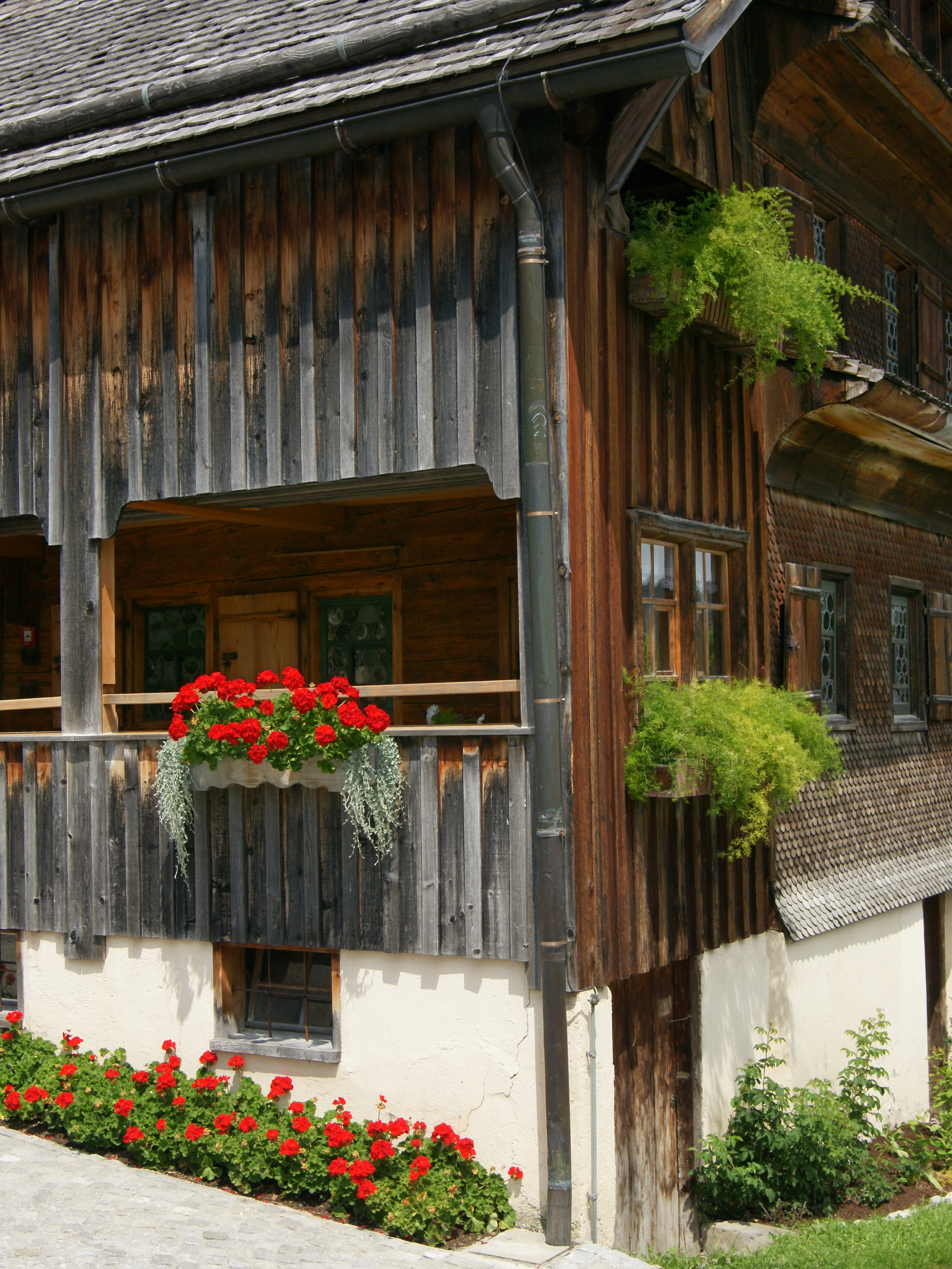
Schopf of the Angelika Kauffmann Museum in Schwarzenberg in the Bregenz Forest. The house is listed as protected monument.

The residential wing is built over a foundation building that is used as a basement. The Bregenzerwälderhaus has a mezzanine floor, an upper floor, and younger types also have an attic.

The residential wing on the mezzanine floor was originally designed as a Flurküchenhaus ("corridor kitchen house"). The hallway in the middle of the house served both as a kitchen and as an access area for the living room and bedroom (Gaden).

The special feature of the residential wing is the Schopf, a veranda-like porch with folding shutters, which extends over the entire sunny eaves side of the residential wing. On the side facing away from the sun, the Schopf is found in a closed design and is thus integrated into the building as a Kammer ("chamber") or Stüble ("lounge"). In the warm season, the Schopf serves as a dining and lounge area, as a sheltered place for ornamental and useful plants and as a utility room. In winter, the Schopf with the shutters down made a significant contribution to improving the thermal balance of the Bregenzerwälderhaus.

On the upper floor of the living wing, there are usually two chambers that serve as sleeping quarters. The continuation of the two Schöpfe (two veranda-like porches) on the upper floor (Oberschopf, Schlupf) are used as storage rooms. Above the Hof ("courtyard") separating the living and working area is the Sälestüble ("lounge") on the upper floor of the sun-facing eaves side, which in its original form served the grandparents, but is often also used as a guest room or workshop.

On the upper floor of the service wing, there are areas for storing hay (Heudiele) and agricultural equipment. The barn is located on the ground floor of the service wing, and adjoining it the Tenne, the Hof used as a traffic zone, which are accessible from two sides, but today mostly only from one side.

=== Exterior ===
Almost without exception, the roof of the Bregenzerwälderhaus is a gable roof, which is flatter (18 to 22 degrees) in older types and later steeper (45 degrees). The gable facade is characterized by two to three rows of large windows with central beams.

The facade of the Bregenzerwald house was originally unclad and only provided with a protective coating. The houses have only been provided with wooden shingles since the 19th century.

== The Bregenzerwälderhaus today ==
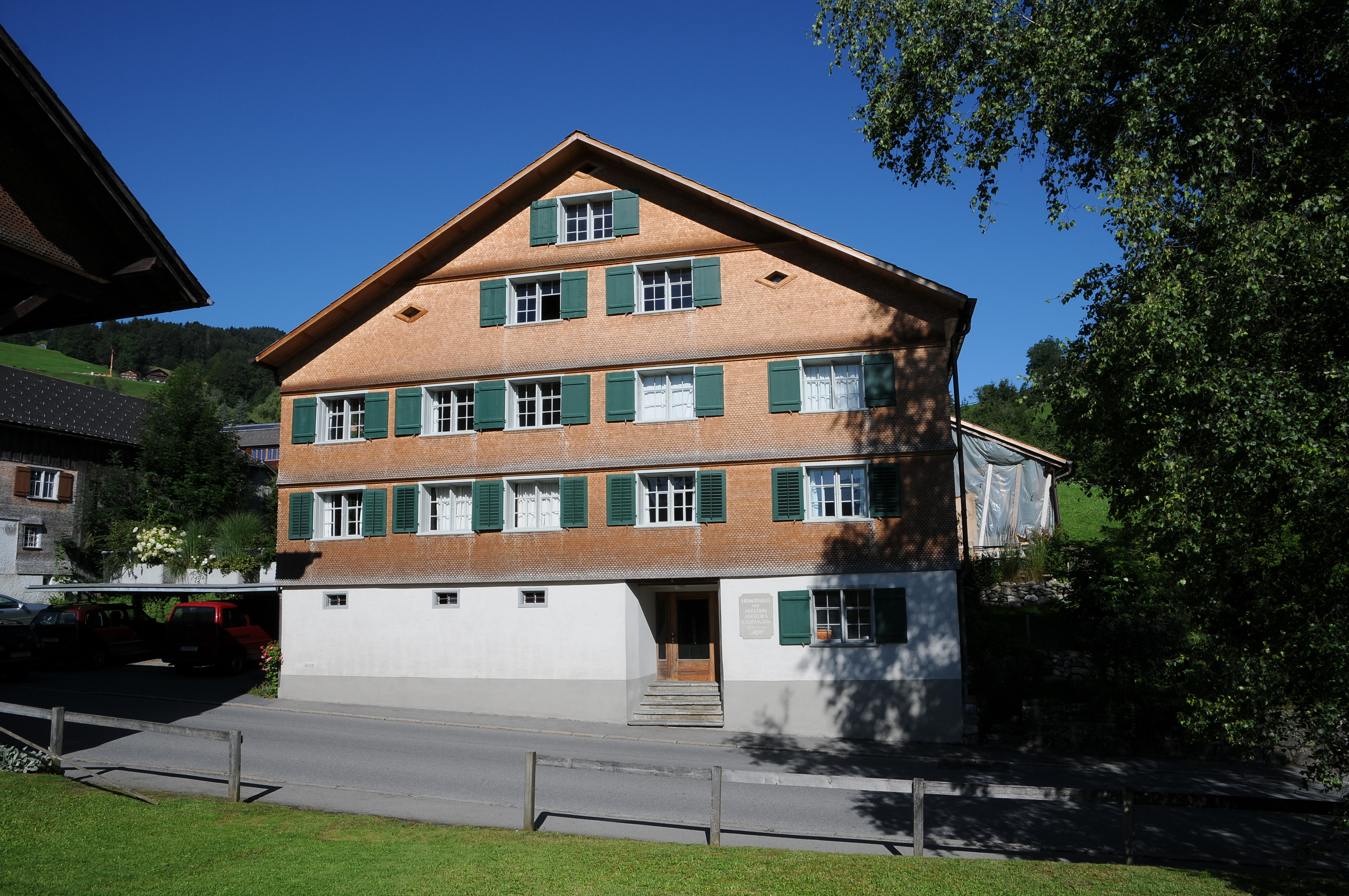
Hof 6 in Schwarzenberg (Vorarlberg)

In the centre of the village of Schwarzenberg, there are still plenty of Bregenzerwälder houses. They are very rich in terms of detailed design, not only in appearance, but also in the layout and interior design, as far as they are in their original condition. The uniformity of the buildings is particularly noteworthy. This is not only due to the same construction time immediately after the great fire of 1755, but also to the independent handicraft tradition of the Bregenz Forest and the prosperity of the population at that time. Many of them are listed as protected monuments by the Austrian government.

The oldest house on the square is the Mesnerstüble, which was spared the fire in 1755. Most of the houses are privately owned and therefore cannot be visited. Only the guest rooms of the Hotel Hirschen and the Gasthaus Adler, as well as the Mesnerstüble can be viewed from the inside by visitors.

The Hof 6 ("Barn no. 6") in Schwarzenberg is an example of a contemporary twist on the Bregenzerwälderhaus. The original Hof 6 is a farmhouse built in 1646. The house was later the home of the painter Angelika Kauffmann. When the architect and new owner Thomas Mennel decided to restore the building and play with its given qualities, it was almost 450 years old. He kept the outer appearance and transformed the interior into a warm and modern residential home with an energy efficient heat insulation system.

== Photo gallery ==
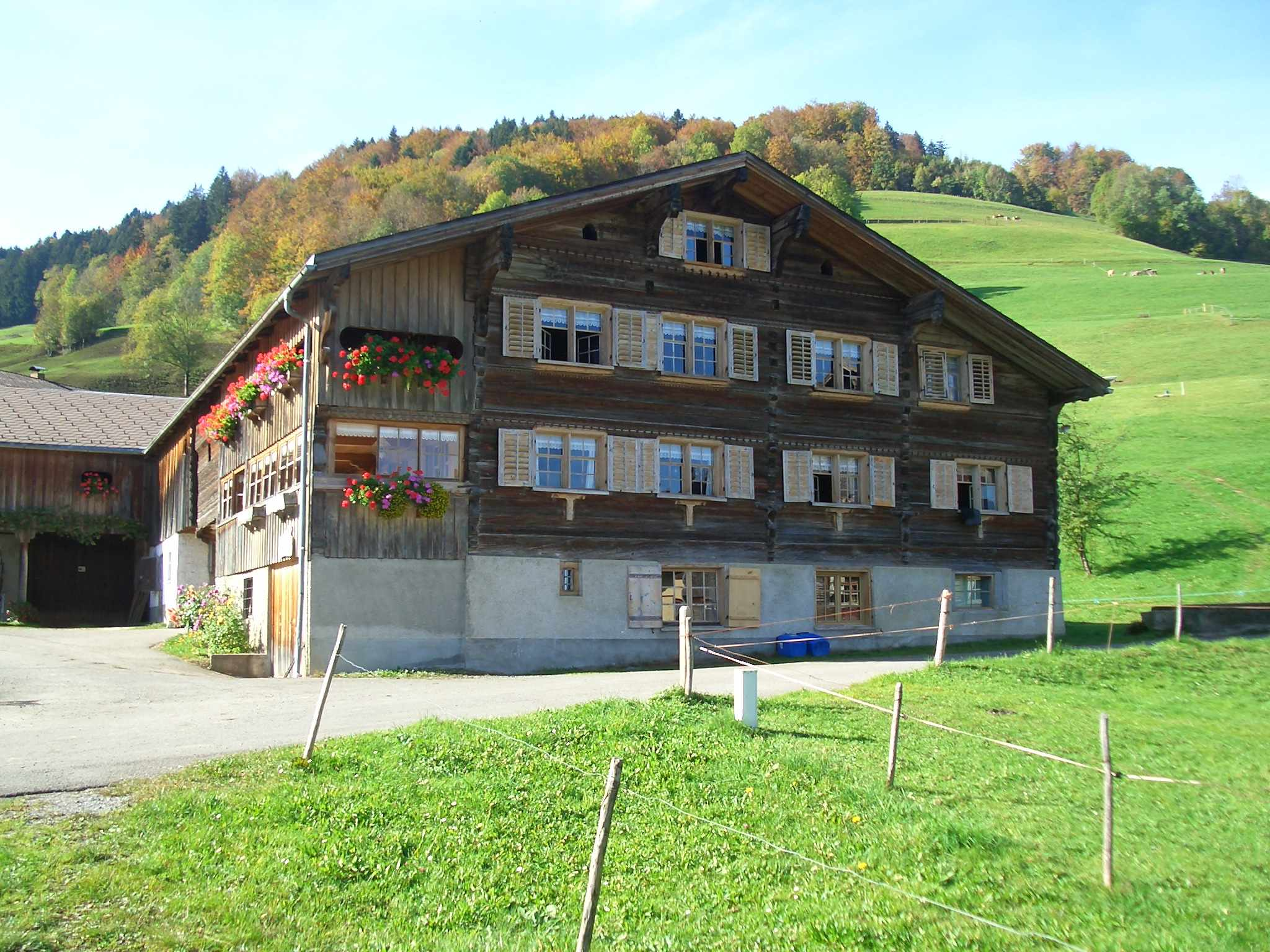
Bregenzerwälderhaus in Schwarzenberg (Vorarlberg)

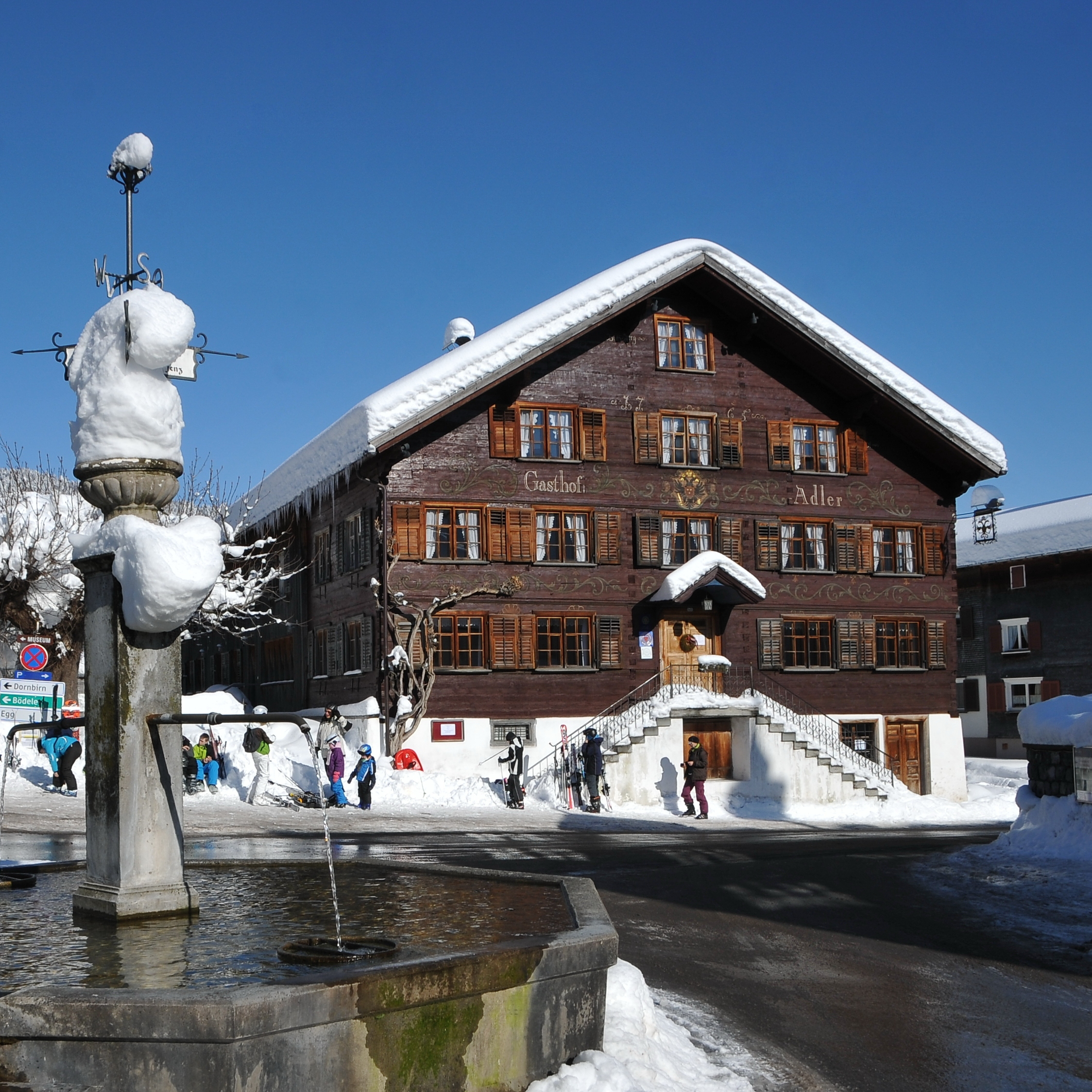
The interior of the Gasthof Adler in Schwarzenberg is open to visitors

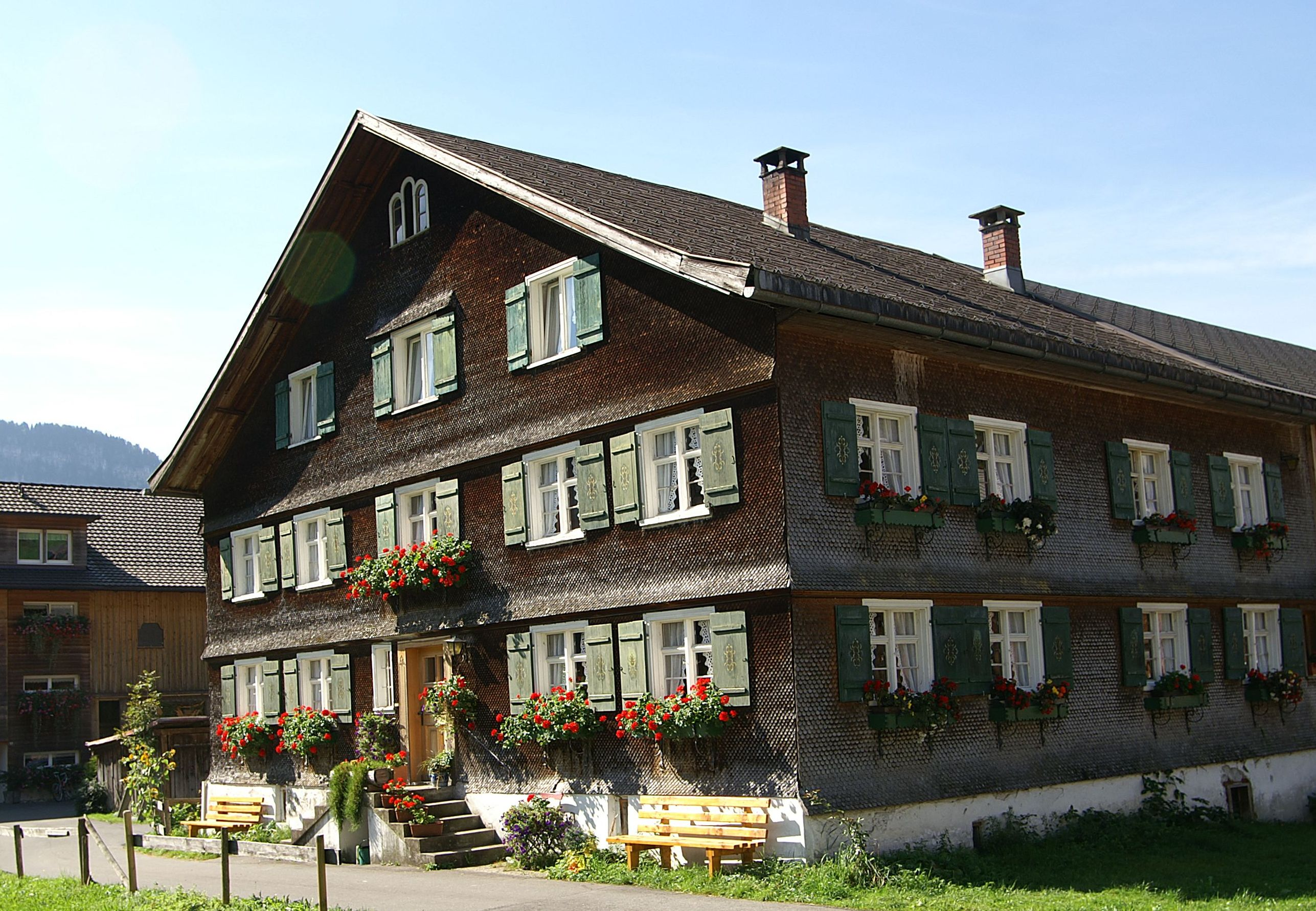
Bregenzerwälderhaus in Bezau

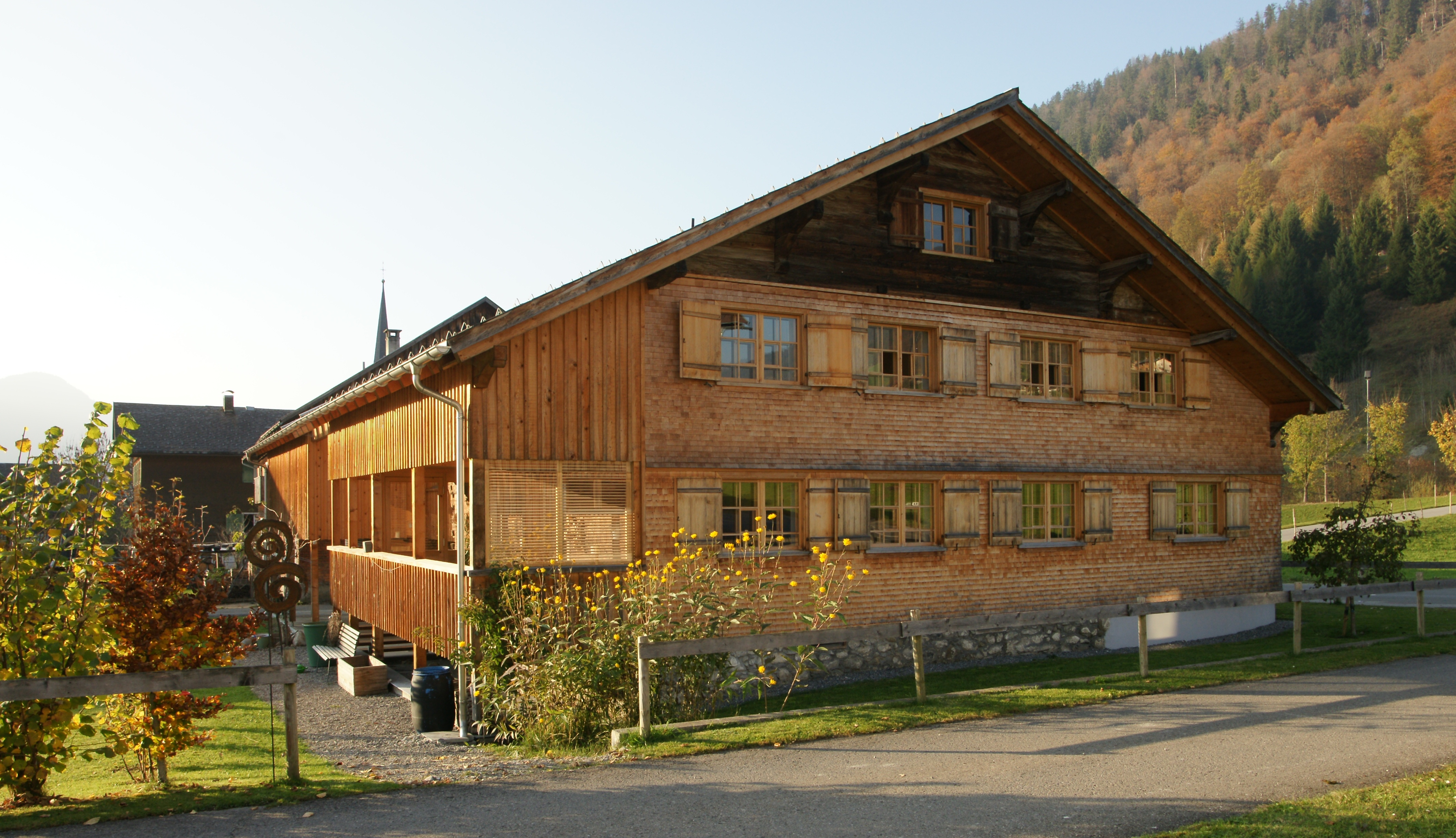
Bregenzerwälderhaus in Bizau

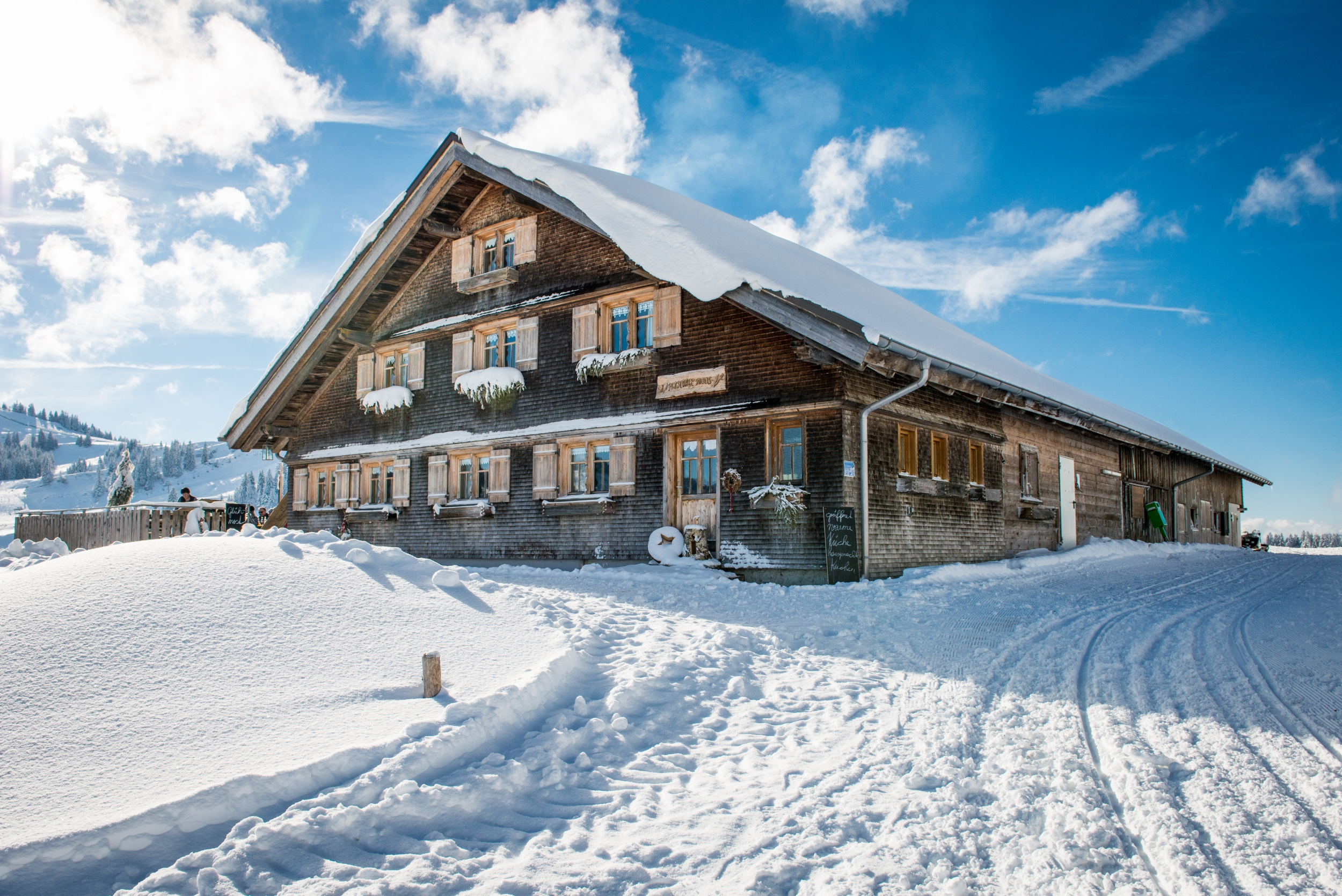
Bregenzerwälderhaus near the Hochhäderich mountain top (Alpe Moos)

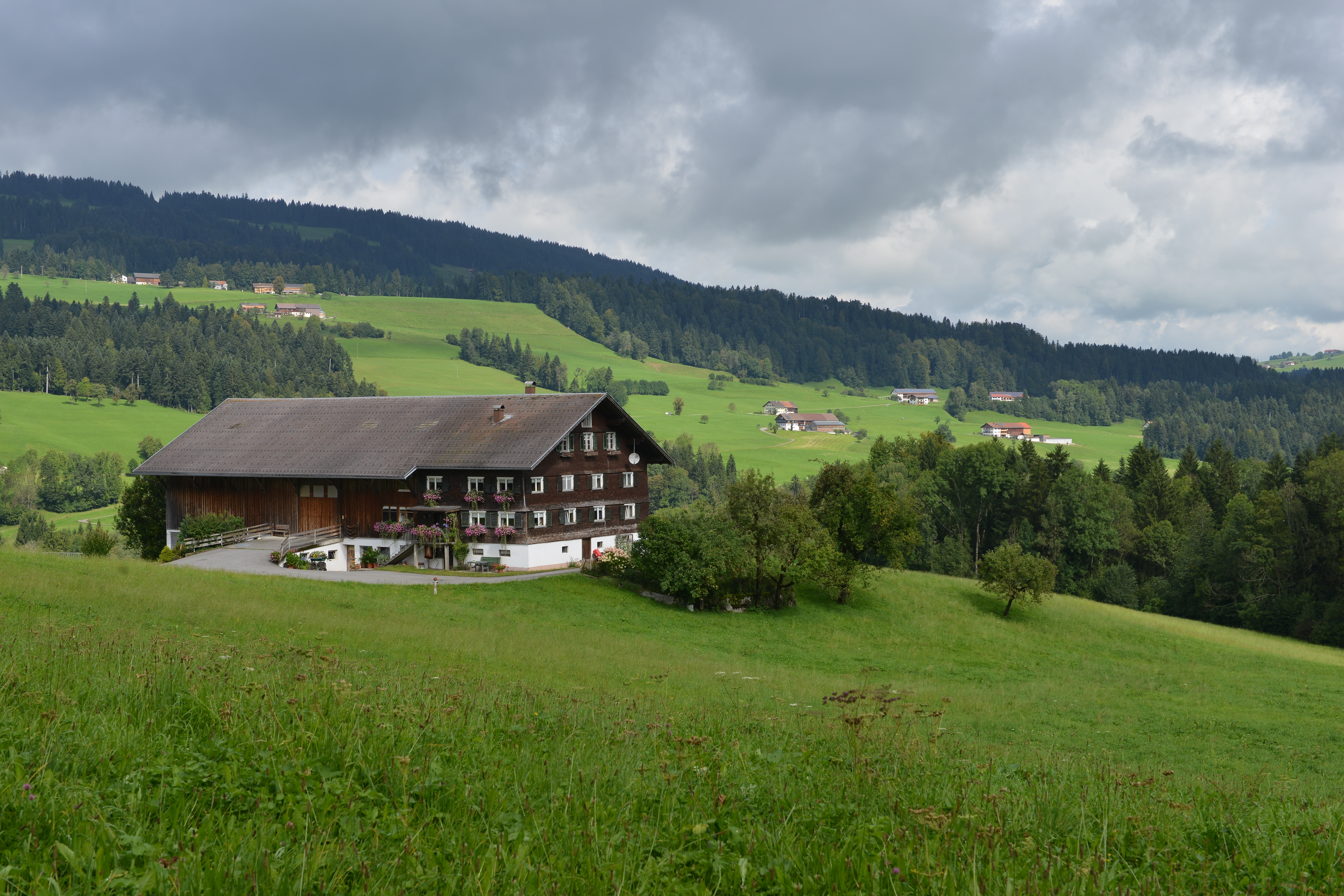
Bregenzerwälderhaus in Riefensberg

== See also ==
- Montafonerhaus
- Housebarn

== Sources ==
- Newspaper article about vacant Bregenzerwald houses and their renovation (published in Der Standard on 15 September 2017)
