= Black Forest house =

Type of house found in southwestern Germany

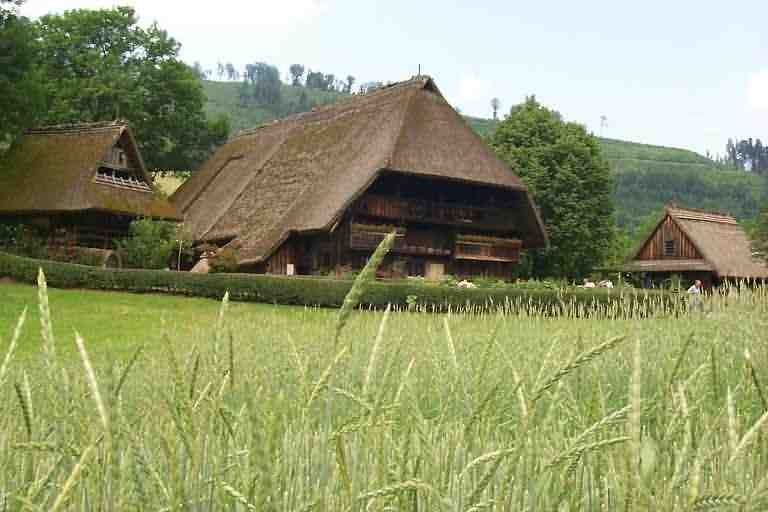
The farm of Vogtsbauernhof in the eponymous open-air museum

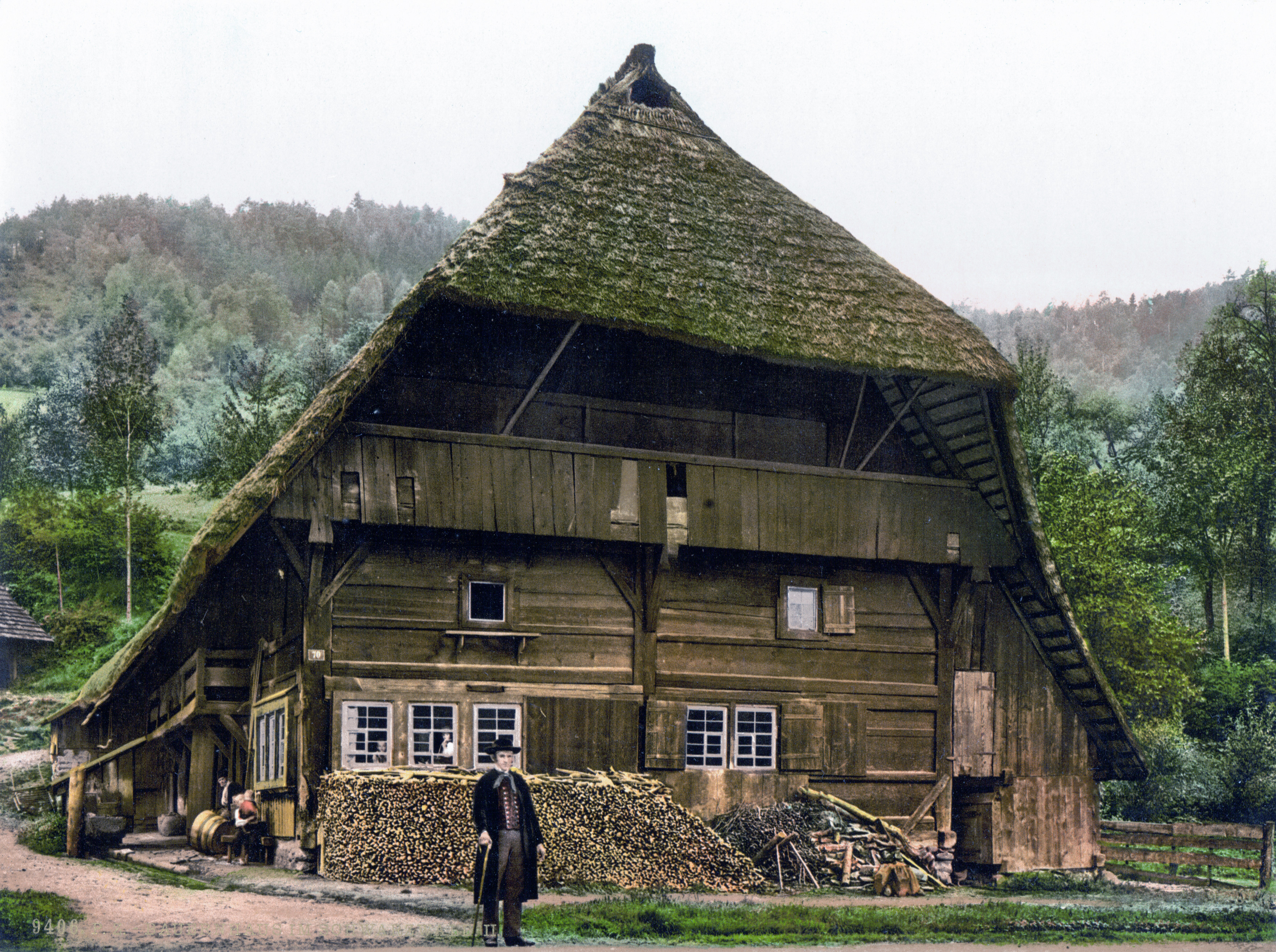
House of a Black Forest peasant farmer in Baden around 1900

The Black Forest house (German: Schwarzwaldhaus) is a byre-dwelling that is found mainly in the central and southern parts of the Black Forest in southwestern Germany. It is characterised externally by a long hipped or half-hipped roof that descends to the height of the ground floor. This type of dwelling is suited to the conditions of the Black Forest: hillside locations, broad tracks, high levels of snowfall and heavy wind loading. Individual farms, such as the Hierahof near Kappel, which are still worked today, are over 400 years old. The Black Forest house is described by Dickinson as very characteristic of the Swabian farmstead type.

== House types ==
Depending on the site of the individual farms various types of Black Forest house have emerged which are designed to cope with the specific climatic situation. Hermann Schilli, the initiator of the open-air museum of Vogtsbauernhof distinguishes seven types of Black Forest house:

1. The "heath house" (Heidenhaus), or "hill house" (Höhenhaus), is by far the oldest form of Black Forest farmhouse, and is mostly found in the High Black Forest. In its older form the living rooms face the slope of the hill. Its name is explained thus: "The farmers of the High Black Forest have kept alive the knowhow for building the unique medieval design elements of the single-roofed house to this day. It may be for this reason they believed this form of house was invented by heathens and therefore called it a "heath house". Doubtless the term was intended to symbolize the archaic appearance of this type of house and its supposedly ancient origins…"
2. The "heath house in its newer form" (Heidenhaus in seiner neueren Form) differs from the older form by the rotation of the floor plan through around 180°, so that the living rooms now face the valley. The roof on both forms is usually a full hipped roof that descends to the ground floor, i.e. not a half-hipped roof.
3. The "Zarten house" (Zartener Haus) tends to be found on level valley bottoms. Its name is derived from the villages of Zarten and Kirchzarten in the Dreisam Valley in the southern Black Forest.
4. The "Schauinsland house" (Schauinslandhaus), named after the local hill of Freiburg, the Schauinsland, is located in the high regions, near the summits of the southern Black Forest. It stands, unlike the aforementioned types, with its longer side facing the slope, from where the silage is also transported.
5. The "Hotzen house" (Hotzenhaus) must withstand similar climate conditions; it is still widespread in the climatically harsh Hotzenwald. Here too, the house usually has its longer side facing the slope and has a long roof on all sides.
6. The "Gutach house" (Gutacher Haus) is found on the eastern perimeter of the Black Forest. It is possibly the most typical form of farmhouse that is linked to the Black Forest.
7. The "Kinzig valleys house" (Kinzigtäler Haus) is mainly found in the catchment areas of the rivers Acher, Rench, Kinzig and Schutter, i.e. in the central part of the Black Forest. It is externally similar to the Gutach house, but differs from the latter in its design and floor plan.

== Design ==
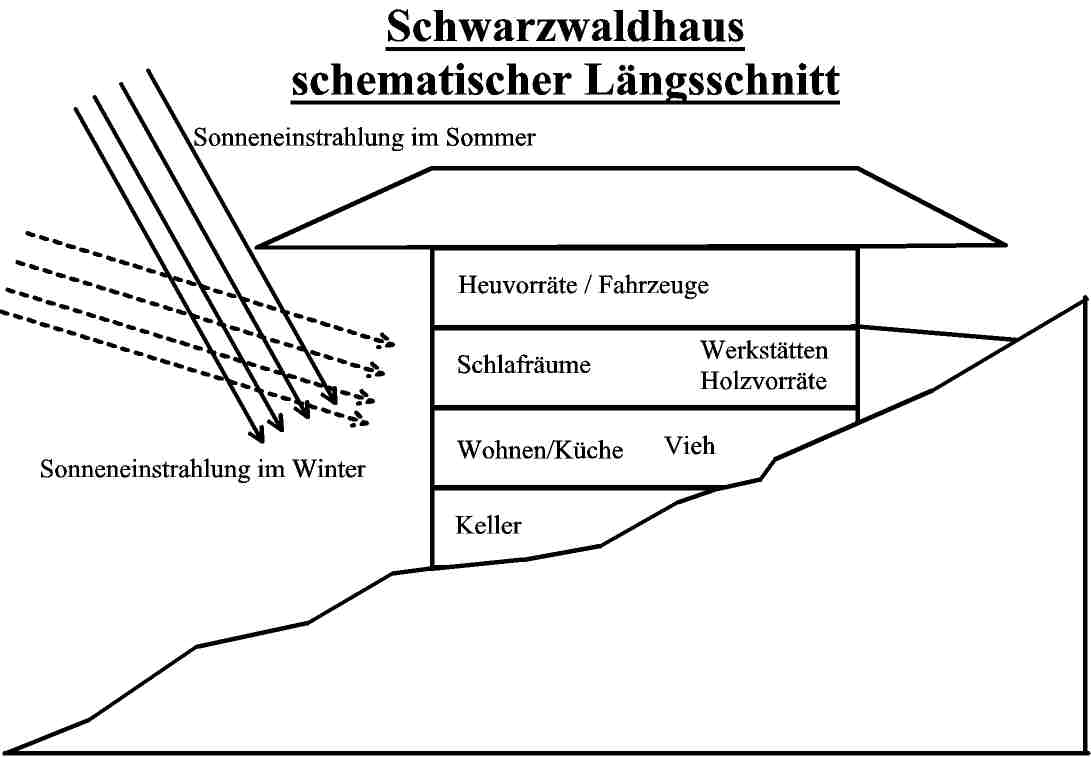
Schematic longitudinal section through a Black Forest farmhouse. Key: Sonneneinstrahlung im Sommer = "direction of sun's rays in summer", Sonneneinstrahlung im Winter = "direction of sun's rays in winter", Heuvorräte/Fahrzeuge = "hay stores / vehicles", Schlafräume = "bedrooms", Werkstätten = "workshops", Holzvorräte - "wood stores", Wohnen/Küche = "living area and kitchen", Vieh = "cattle", Keller = "cellar"

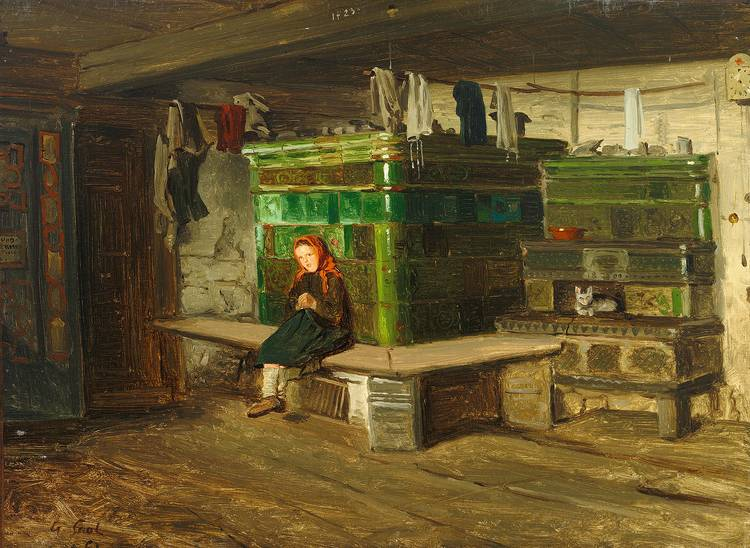
Black Forest kitchen with a cocklestove, painting by Georg Saal, 1861

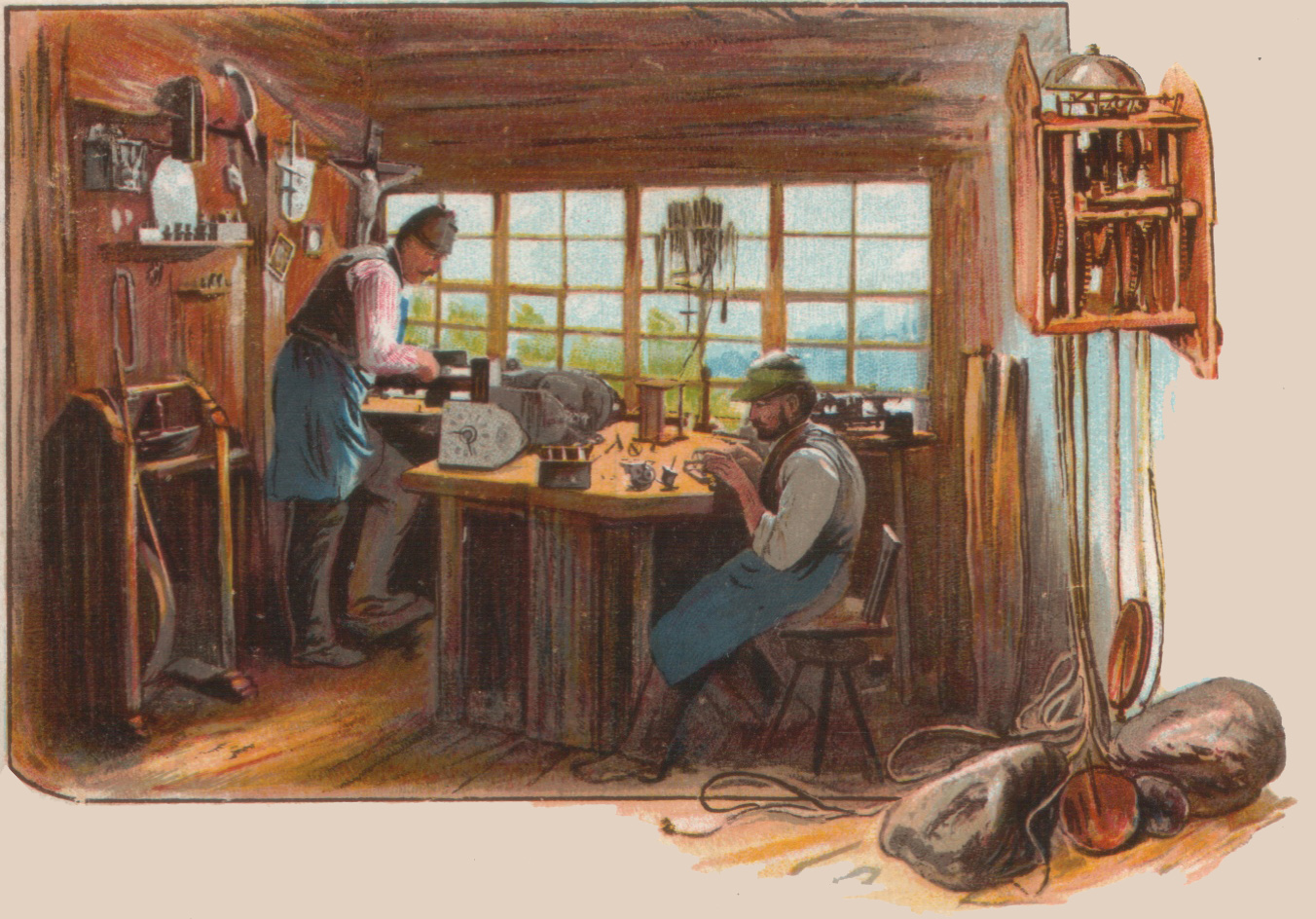
Clockmaker's workshop in a Black Forest house, based on a watercolour by L. Sigwarth

The house combines both living and working rooms, as well as animal stalls, under one roof. The largely wooden superstructure of the house usually rests on a basement made of natural stone.

=== Roof ===
The great roof, with its long overhangs, sweeps right down to the ground floor at the sides, shading the walls of the house in summer whilst allowing the sun, now much lower in the sky, to warm the walls in winter. Depending on the situation, the roof was covered with wooden shingles or thatch, whilst today they are generally covered with tiles. In the high regions of the Black Forest, where cattle farming and forestry predominate, shingles are overwhelmingly used, whilst in the valleys, thatch is most common. The half-hipped roof, with its sides sloping in all directions, reduces the wind loading area and reduces wear.

The attic acts as a hayloft and is accessed via a ramp or a footbridge from the rising slope behind the house. The often dormer-shaped entrance is known in Alemannic as a "Ifahrhüsli". The hay can easily be thrown down into the stalls below from the hayloft through a so-called hay hatch (Heuloch, literally "hay hole").

== Living area ==
The centrepoint of the living area was a centrally-sited cocklestove (Kachelofen). It was also known in Alemannic as a Kunscht. Heated from the kitchen, it simultaneously warmed the parlour as well as the bedrooms above. The distribution of warm air to the floors above can be regulated by wooden slats. Often there was no chimney, rather the smoke was funnelled away by a flue, was used to smoke meat and then exited through the roof. That neutralised the dampness of the stalls and preserved the wood.

== Cattle stalls ==
In the rear part of the house were the cattle stalls; the animals contributed to the heating of the house in the winter. Sometimes the quarters for the farm hands and maids were situated above the stalls.

== Cellar ==
The cellar, built from natural stone, protected the building from the dampness of the ground. It acted both in winter and summer as a cool storage area for easily perishable foodstuffs.

== Outbuildings ==
Depending on local circumstances and the scope of farming activity there could be several outbuildings near the actual farmhouse, including the Libding, a small home for old farmers who lived here after handing the farm over. There was often a chapel next to the farmyard too. Sometimes there was also a small bakehouse, sheds for implements, coaches, sleds and, where there was a stream, a small corn mill for domestic use. Next to many farms there was also a Löschteich, a pond that provided a reservoir of water in the event of fire.

== Black Forest houses today ==
Many Black Forest farms still have the typical Black Forest houses today. However, internally they have usually been upgraded to satisfy modern day needs (in terms of living comfort and the installation of machines). Sometimes new cattle sheds were built next to the farmhouse in order to ensure that the keeping of dairy cows met modern standards. Frequently, silos have been erected next to the farmyards for silage feed. Farmers often convert rooms that have become free into guest rooms or holiday apartments in order to provide an additional source of income.

A variety of historic farms from different parts of the Black Forest have been rebuilt, true to the original, in the Vogtsbauernhof Open Air Museum.

In the television series Schwarzwaldhaus 1902, the broadcasting company Südwestrundfunk invited a modern family to live in a way that replicated life a hundred years ago in a Black Forest house in the village of Münstertal in the southern Black Forest.

== Literature ==
- Herman Schilli: Das Schwarzwaldhaus, 4th ed., Kohlhammer Verlag, Stuttgart, 1982, ISBN 3-17-007576-4.
- Ulrich Schnitzer: Schwarzwaldhäuser von gestern für die Landwirtschaft von morgen, Theiss, Stuttgart, 1989, ISBN 978-3-8062-0567-1 (Research work at the Institute for Local, Regional and State Planning at the University of Karlsruhe, Educational and Research Area Planning and Building in Rural Areas).
