= George Linney =

English cricketer

Personal information
- Full name: George Frederick Linney
- Born: 18 November 1869; Guildford, Surrey, England
- Died: 5 November 1927 (aged 57); Weston-super-Mare, Somerset, England

Domestic team information
- Years: Team
- 1912-1923: Tasmania
- Source: Cricinfo, 23 January 2016

George Frederick Linney (18 November 1869 – 5 November 1927) was an English-born cricketer who played in a single first-class match for Tasmania in the 1912/13 Australian season. He was born in Guildford, Surrey and died at Weston-super-Mare, Somerset.

Linney was a 43-year-old tail-end batsman and wicketkeeper who played in the one-off match against New South Wales in March 1913 in which Herbie Collins made the highest score, 282, of his entire cricket career. New South Wales scored 614 for five wickets in their single innings before declaring; Linney had no part in any of the wickets and he scored 1 not out and 4 in Tasmania's two innings.

In 1914, Linney attempted to raise a Tasmanian cricket team to tour England to play matches against public schools, Minor Counties, and the universities, but despite encouragement from the Marylebone Cricket Club (MCC), the idea was abandoned as too expensive. Linney was a schoolmaster and taught at The Friends' School, Hobart and at Stramongate School at Kendal in England, both of them Quaker schools.

George Linney's son Keith Linney, born in Tasmania, went in the other direction and played first-class cricket for Somerset in England in more than 30 games across the 1930s.

== See also ==
- List of Tasmanian representative cricketers
