= Luney =

Luney is a surname, derived from O'Luanaigh, and related to Lunney.

Notable people with the surname include:

- Charles Luney (1905–2006), New Zealand builder and company director

== See also ==
- Looney (disambiguation)
- Lunney
