= Linhay =

Type of farm building

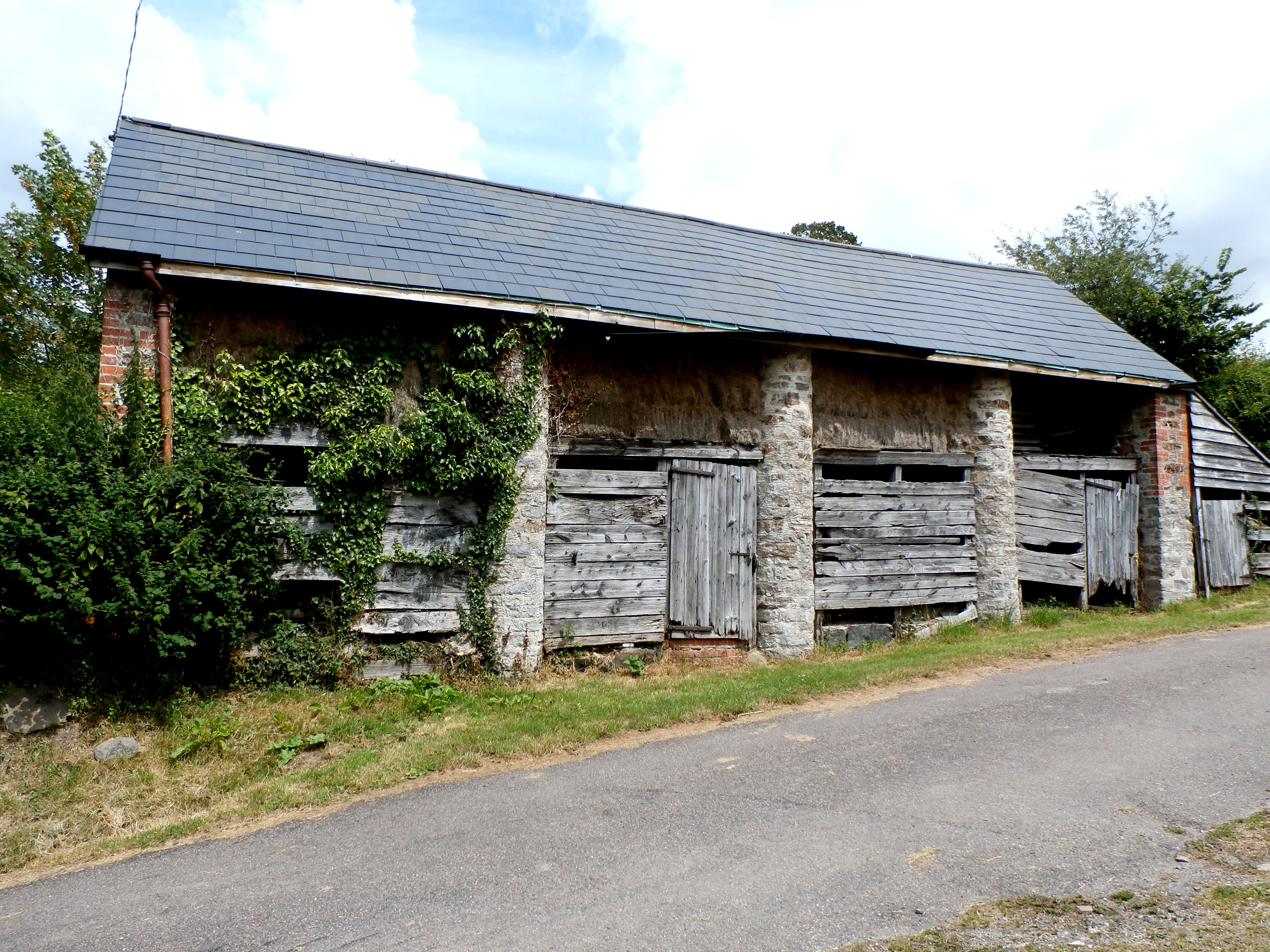
Linhay at Poole Farm, Exebridge, Devon. Hay is stored in the tallet or hay-loft above and cattle are housed over winter below. The full-height columns are of rubble-stone and lime-mortar

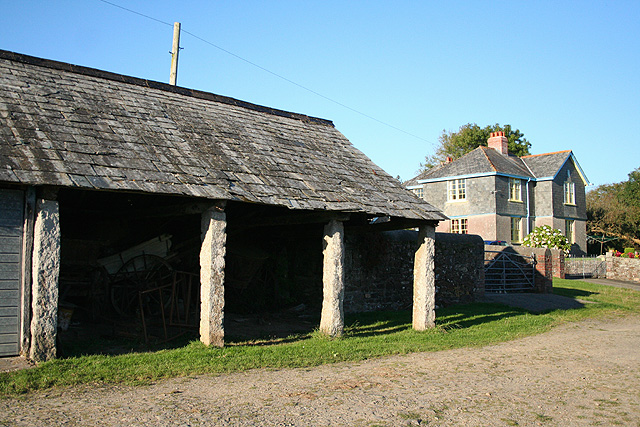
Linhay at Higher Troswell, Cornwall

A linhay (/ˈlɪni/ LIN-ee) is a type of farm building found particularly in Devon and Somerset, South West England. It is characterised as a two-storeyed building with an open front, with tallet or hay-loft above and livestock housing below. It often has a lean-to roof, and the front generally consists of regularly-spaced pillars or columns. Cattle linhays were used to house cattle in the winter with hay storage above. Owing to the wide, open front, hay was easily thrown up into the tallet for storage after hay-making by a man standing on a hay-cart using a pitch-fork. The hay was kept dry by the roof while at the same time acting as insulation for the livestock below, and was easily fed as daily rations to the cattle below by dropping it through openings in the floor directly into hay racks accessible to the livestock. A cart linhay stored carts and other farm machinery in place of livestock, with hay above.

Linhays are now largely obsolete as in England cattle are generally housed in large pole barns with corrugated iron or plastic roofs and are fed silage, either in large round bales or in troughs, chopped up by machinery. These modern structures make possible feeding and mucking out with large tractors.

A rare form is the circular linhay, found for example on Braunton Marsh in Devon.

== North America ==
In Newfoundland English a linney is a storage space, kitchen, or porch generally built as an addition at the rear of a house. In American English a linhay is an open lean-to shed attached to a farm yard.

== See also ==
- Linhay in Barn#Other farm buildings often associated with barns
