= Keith Linney =

Personal information
- Full name: Charles Keith Linney
- Born: 26 August 1912; Hobart, Tasmania, Australia
- Died: 12 October 1992 (aged 80); Tunbridge Wells, Kent, England
- Batting: Left-handed
- Bowling: Left-arm medium-pace
- Role: Batsman
- Relatives: Father George

Domestic team information
- Years: Team
- 1931–1937: Somerset
- First-class debut: 6 May 1931 Somerset v Hampshire
- Last First-class: 25 June 1937 Somerset v Essex

Career statistics
Competition	First-class
Matches	32
Runs scored	576
Batting average	14.40
100s/50s	0/1
Top score	60
Balls bowled	222
Wickets	2
Bowling average	59.50
5 wickets in innings	0
10 wickets in match	0
Best bowling	1/9
Catches/stumpings	9/–
- Source: CricketArchive, 7 July 2010

Charles Keith Linney (26 August 1912 – 12 October 1992) played first-class cricket for Somerset from 1931 to 1937. He was born in Hobart, Tasmania, Australia and died in Tunbridge Wells, Kent. His father George, who was born in Guildford, Surrey and died in Weston-super-Mare, Somerset, played first-class cricket in one match for Tasmania.

Linney was a left-handed middle or lower order batsman and an occasional left-arm medium pace bowler. Linney had only one season for regular cricket as a professional player, 1931, when he appeared in 19 matches for Somerset and scored 395 first-class runs at an average of 17.17. His one score of more than 50 was an innings of 60 against Surrey at Taunton. In Somerset's mobile and amateur-dominated batting line-up of the 1930s, Linney's next home match after this success saw him batting at No 10 in the order. Wisden Cricketers' Almanack for 1932 noted that Linney played some "bright innings". But after this one season he played only occasionally: seven matches in 1932, one in 1934 and five in 1937, and in none of these matches did he achieve any notable success.
