= Feddersen Wierde =

Former Iron Age settlement in Germany

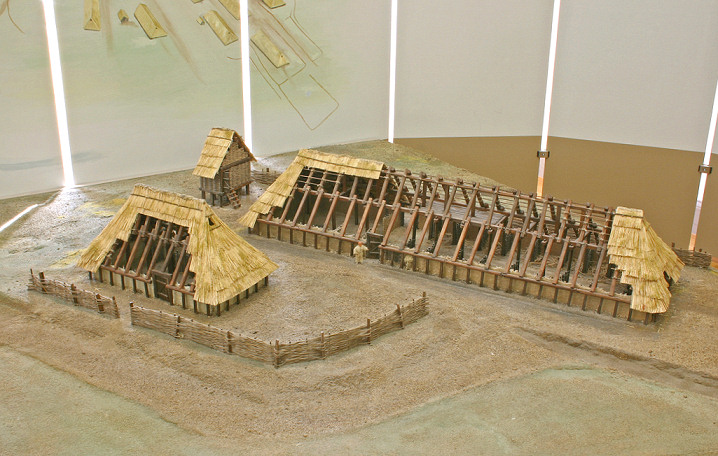
Model of part of the Feddersen Wierde, located in the Landesmuseum Hannover

Feddersen Wierde is a former Iron Age wierde settlement located on marshland on the Weser estuary, 14 km north of Bremerhaven, Germany. It was inhabited from the 1st to 5th centuries AD.

== History ==
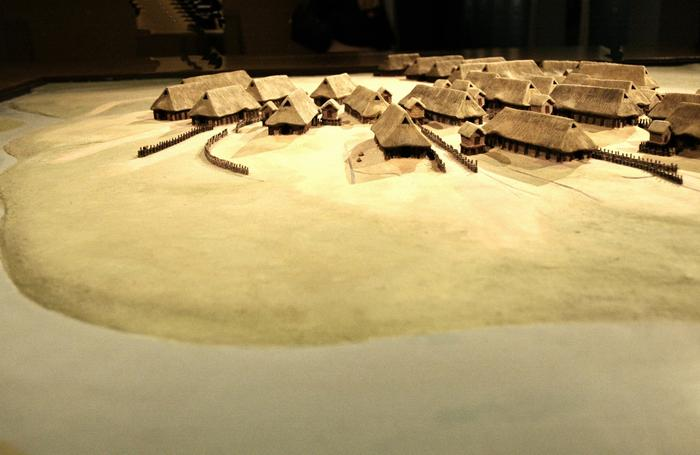
Model of the settlement

Settlers used dung and mud to gradually form a wierde, raising the settlement in a mound shape to better withstand flooding. In the 3rd century AD, the settlement had an estimated 300 inhabitants, 450 cattle, and 26 farmsteads, the majority of which were longhouses made of timber. Settlers grew various cereal grains; meat and seafood made up little of their diet.

=== Abandonment ===
The settlement began to decline during the 5th century AD and was completely abandoned by 450 AD. It is believed that some settlers, as part of the Central Europe's larger trend of westward migration during the period, moved to the Low Countries and eastern Britain.

=== Excavations ===
Excavations were performed by the Lower Saxony Institute for Historical Coastal Research from 1955 to 1963. Organic materials, such as building foundations and bone tools, were well preserved due to the layers of flooring maintaining humidity.

== See also ==
- Wierde
