= Circular linhay =

Ancient English structure type

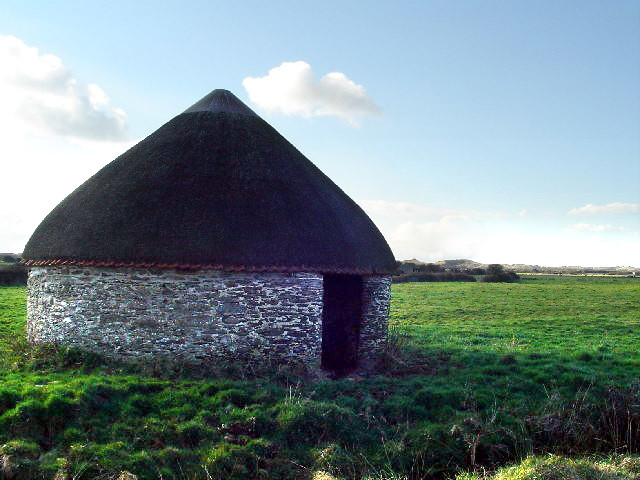
Circular linhay in Braunton in Devon. This linhay is located near drained marshland. Braunton Burrows is visible in the background.

A circular linhay is an ancient type of structure found in England, particularly associated with Devon. Linhay (rhymes with finny), also spelt Linny, is a type of farm building with an open front and usually a lean-to roof. In Newfoundland English a linney is similar to a storage space, kitchen, or porch but as an addition to the rear of a house, and in American English it is an open, lean-to shed attached to a farmyard. Linhays were used to store hay above and shelter cattle (cattle linhay) or farm machinery (cart linhay).

== See also ==
- Linhay in Barn § Other farm buildings often associated with barns
