= Heimatschutz Architecture =

Architectural style

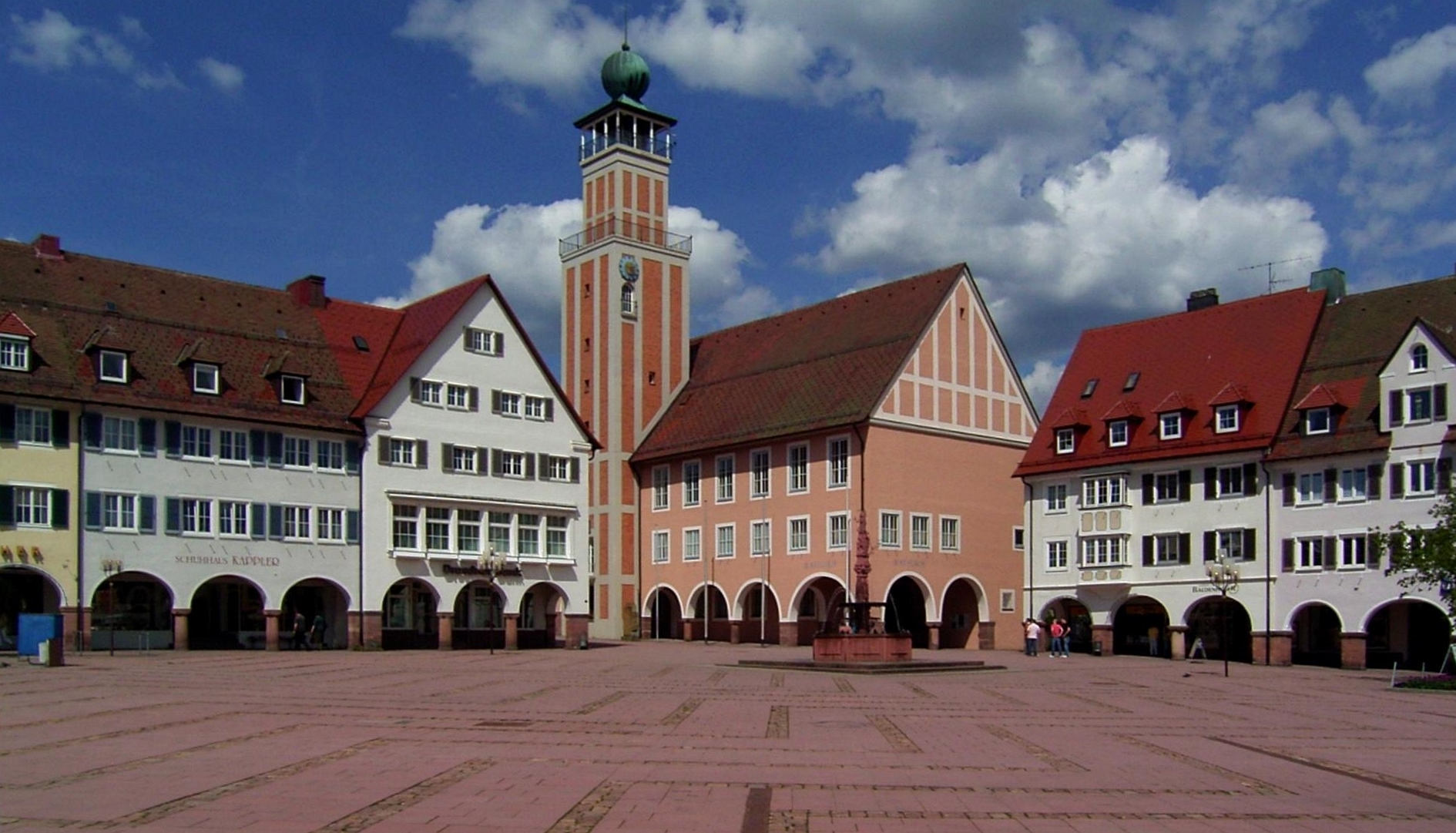
Market Square of Freudenstadt (1950)

Heimatschutz Architecture, or the Heimatschutzstil ("Homeland Preservation Style") or Heimatstil (the latter term is not to be confused with Heimatstil in the sense of late historicism) is a style of architectural modernism that was first described in 1904 and had its prime until 1945. Various buildings were built after the war until around 1960. The main areas of work were settlement building, house building, garden design, industrial building, church building and monument preservation.

The style is closely linked to the various social movements influenced by neo-romantic ideals which aim to strengthen a true love for the homeland (Heimat) but also a romantic nationalism. In opposition to the urbanization in the wake of the Industrial Revolution, their efforts resulted in the birth of numerous associations of history of popular traditions, notably the Wandervogel founded in 1901.

== Description ==
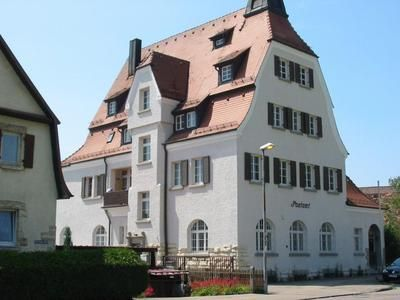
Former post office in Neresheim (1911)

The Heimatschutzstil or Heimatstil was "an architecture on the way to modernity rooted in local and regional building traditions and overcoming historicism and Art Nouveau." Due to its turn away from the previously dominant historicism that copied the “foreign,” it was seen as a reform style. Externally identifying parts or elements are the use of building materials customary in the area (e.g. brick in northern Germany, wood in the Alpine region) and, in contrast to historicism, a renunciation of decorative attributes that imitate older architectural styles in great detail. Elements of traditional architecture, such as arches or columns, could be used in a reduced form. It also uses ornamental elements from the past, such as turrets, pillars or cherubs, and is part of the cultural landscape.

Although it appeared at the turn of the century, it mainly began to be deployed in East Prussia, after the destruction of the First World War, with the support of organizations such as the Reichsverband Ostpreußenhilfe (Reich Association of East Prussia Aid), but also in Bavaria with the construction of a network of new post offices. Although the buildings want to be embedded in a traditional setting, they are often captivating with their size and purity of style.

== History ==
The ancestor of the modern Heimatschutz architecture is the brick architecture of the early industrial era. This style can be found in both sacred and secular architecture, but also in monumental sculpture and garden art.

On 30 March 1904 the Deutsche Bund für Heimatschutz (German Association for the Preservation of the Homeland) was founded in Dresden under the aegis of the ecologist Ernst Rudorff (1840–1916). Its main focus was on architecture, especially building maintenance, with the aim of reviving the old design language and promoting traditional building methods and craftsmanship. In the time of National Socialism, Heimatschutz architecture was preferred, especially in the area of residential construction. In settlement construction, one of the main fields of homeland security, uniform standard buildings were usually erected, which at best had regional elements in the decoration. Representative public buildings, however, were executed in the style of monumental neoclassicism.

After 1945 the importance of this architectural style decreased for a number of reasons. For one, it was expensive; for another, it was superseded by advances in construction technology and, as a result, new architectural forms; and finally, it experienced a politicization in the post-war competition for planning contracts and the filling of public offices, because to some urban planners it did not seem to be clearly distinguishable from construction methods favored by National Socialists like Hanns Dustmann. Some examples of Heimatschutz architecture are more closely related to the brick expressionism of Fritz Höger, who hardly received any commissions between 1933 and 1945. Until around 1960, various ensembles in the Heimatschutz style were built, such as the Freudenstadt Marktplatz from 1950 and the Prinzipalmarkt in Münster, which was rebuilt between 1947 and 1958 in a typical regional way, but not true to the original.

In Switzerland there were several phases of the home style. After the first phase, which lasted until the First World War, it returned in the 1920s as the “Second Home Style” and in the 1940s as the “Landistil” in modified new editions. The “regionalism” of the present is also based on the Heimat style.

== Major Designers to use Heimatschutz Architecture ==
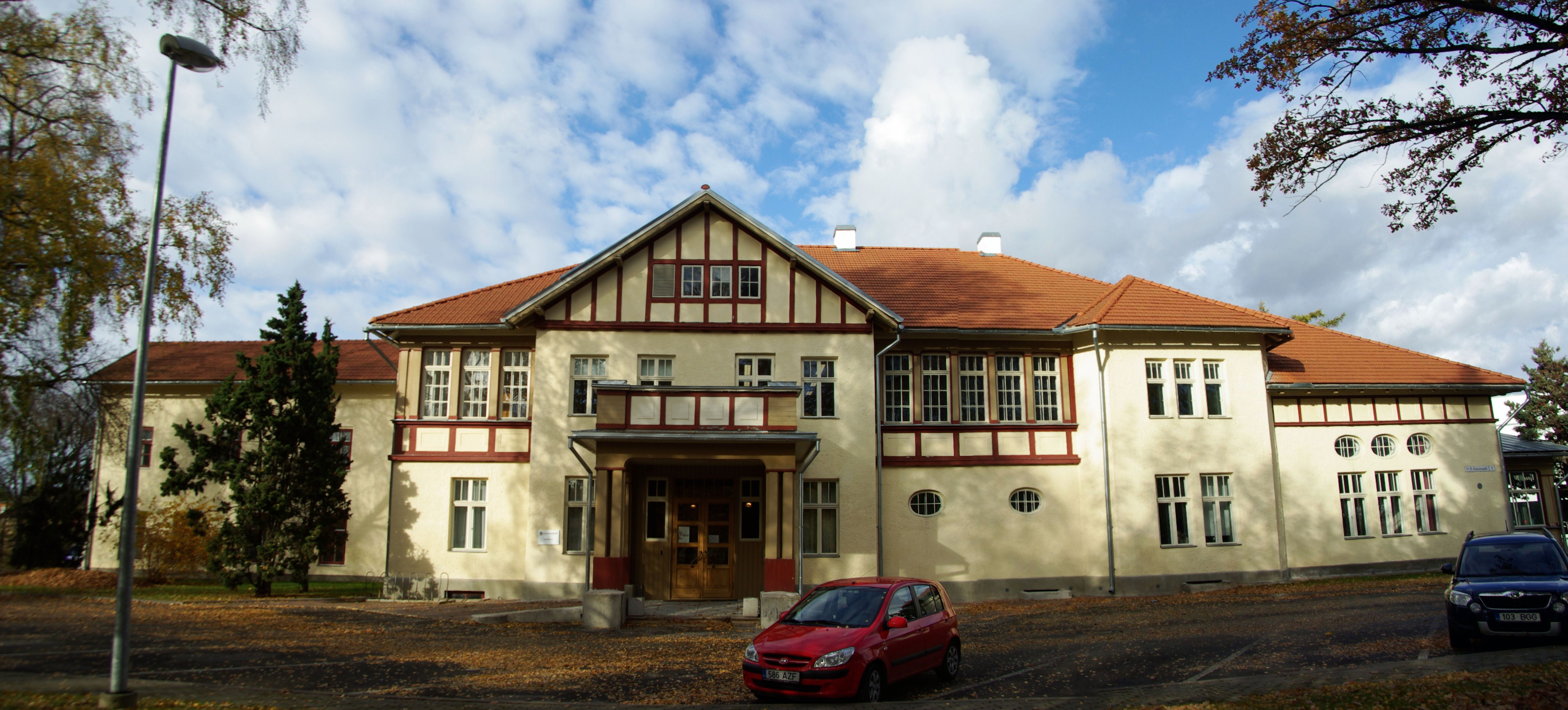
Façade of the old manor of Techlefer, today in Estonia

- Josef Anton Albrich
- Albert Boßlet
- Otto Bubenzer
- Adalbert Erlebach
- Roderich Fick
- Theodor Fischer
- Hans Foschum
- Karl Gruber
- Peter Klotzbach
- Rudolph Lempp
- Alfred Lichtwark
- Stephan Mattar
- Architekturbüro Mattar & Scheler
- Hermann Muthesius
- Ernst Prinz
- Heinrich Renard
- Hans Roß
- Paul Schmitthenner
- Julius Schulte-Frohlinde
- Paul Schultze-Naumburg
- Ludwig Schweizer

== Gallery ==
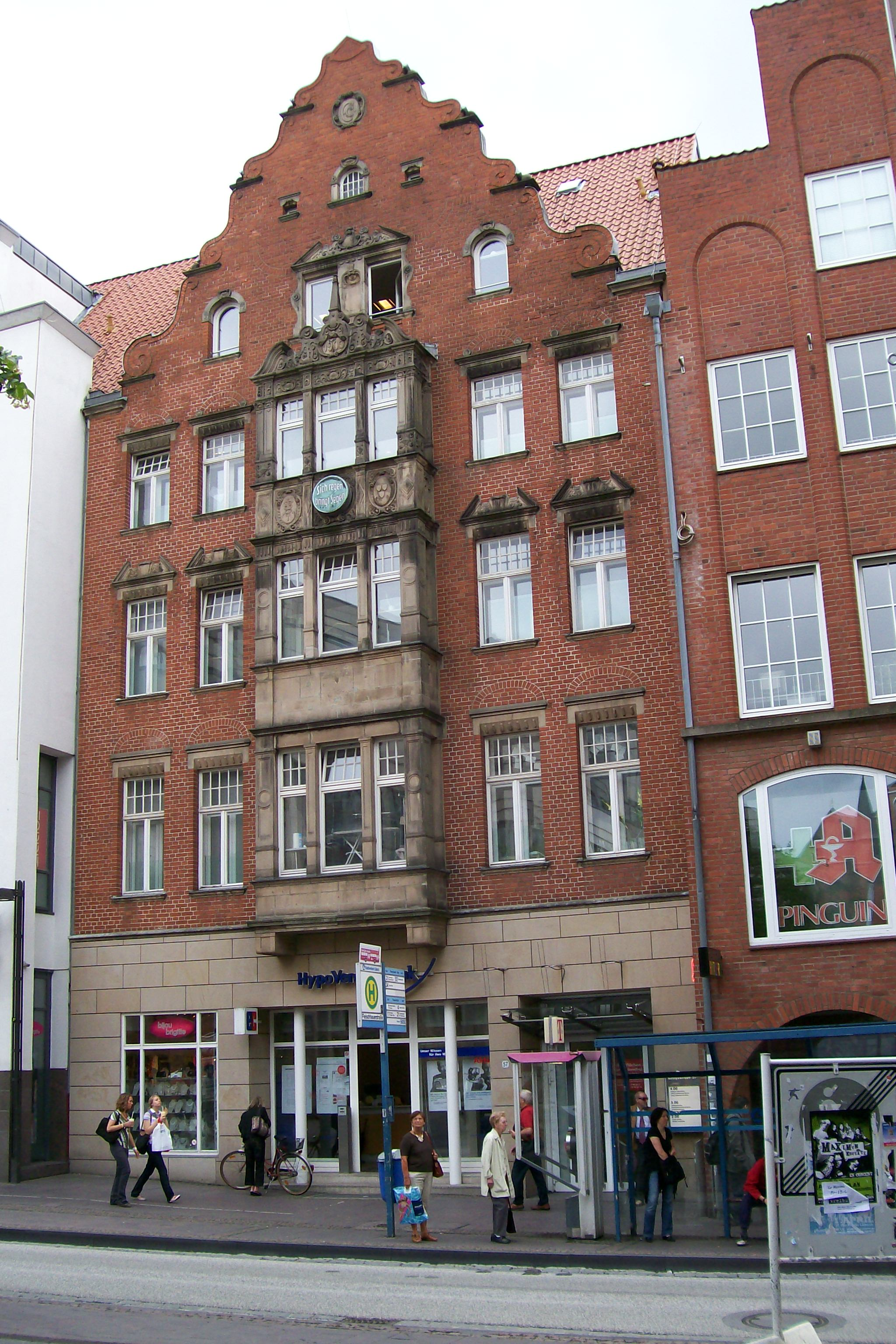
House at Königstraße 57 in Lübeck

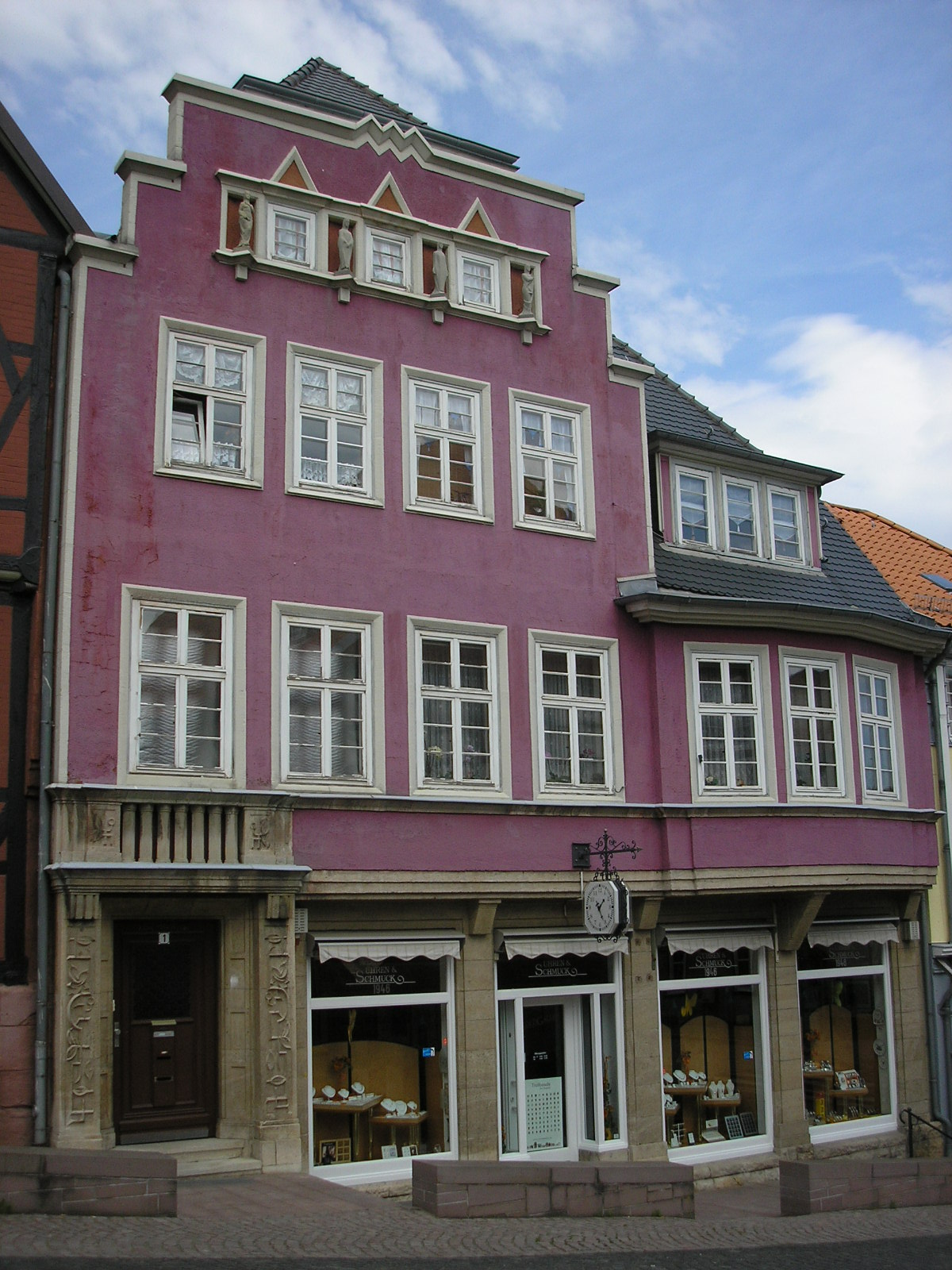
House in the Altstadt (old city) of Heiligenstadt, Thuringia

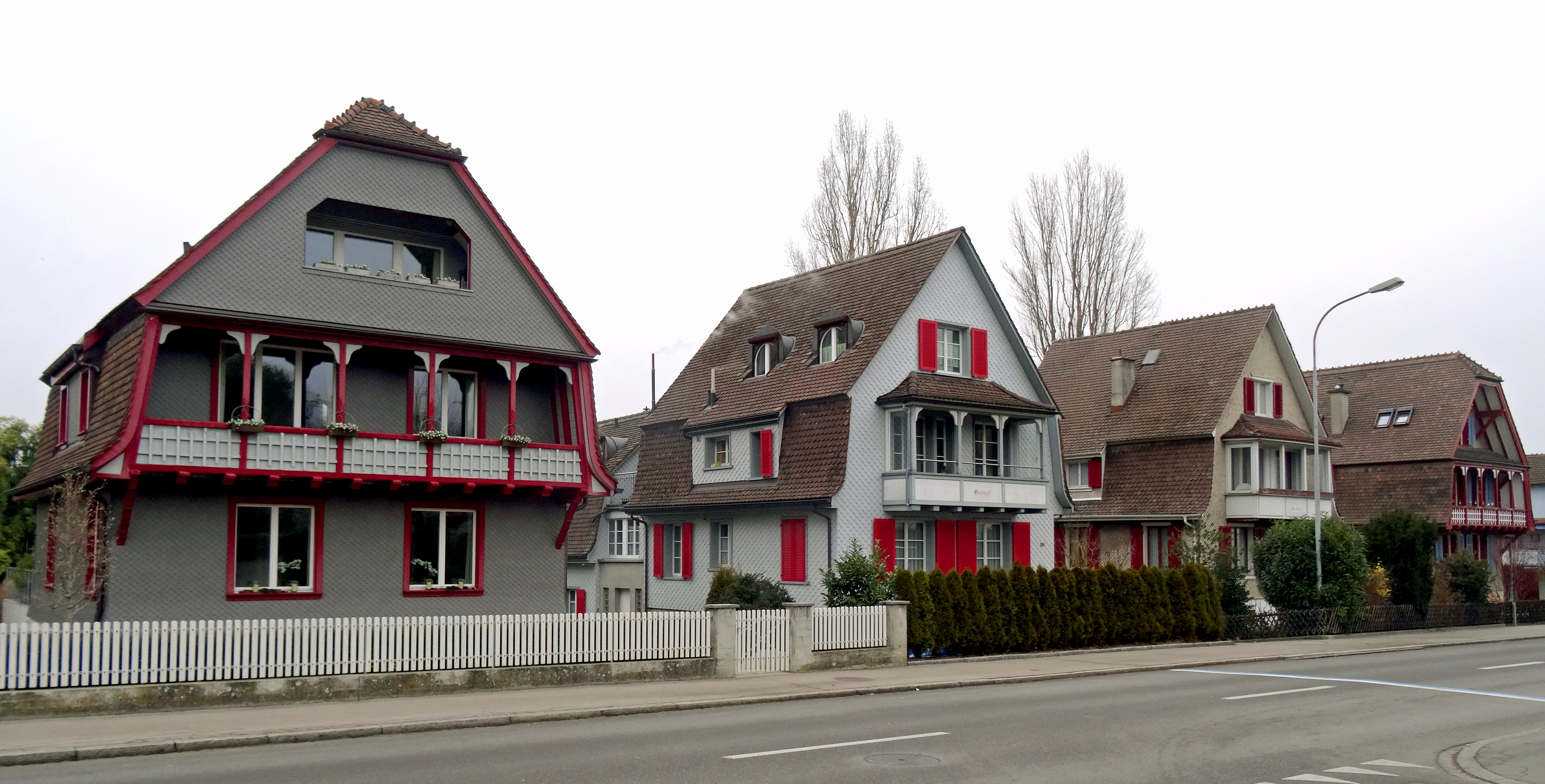
Houses in Steckborn, Canton Thurgau, Switzerland

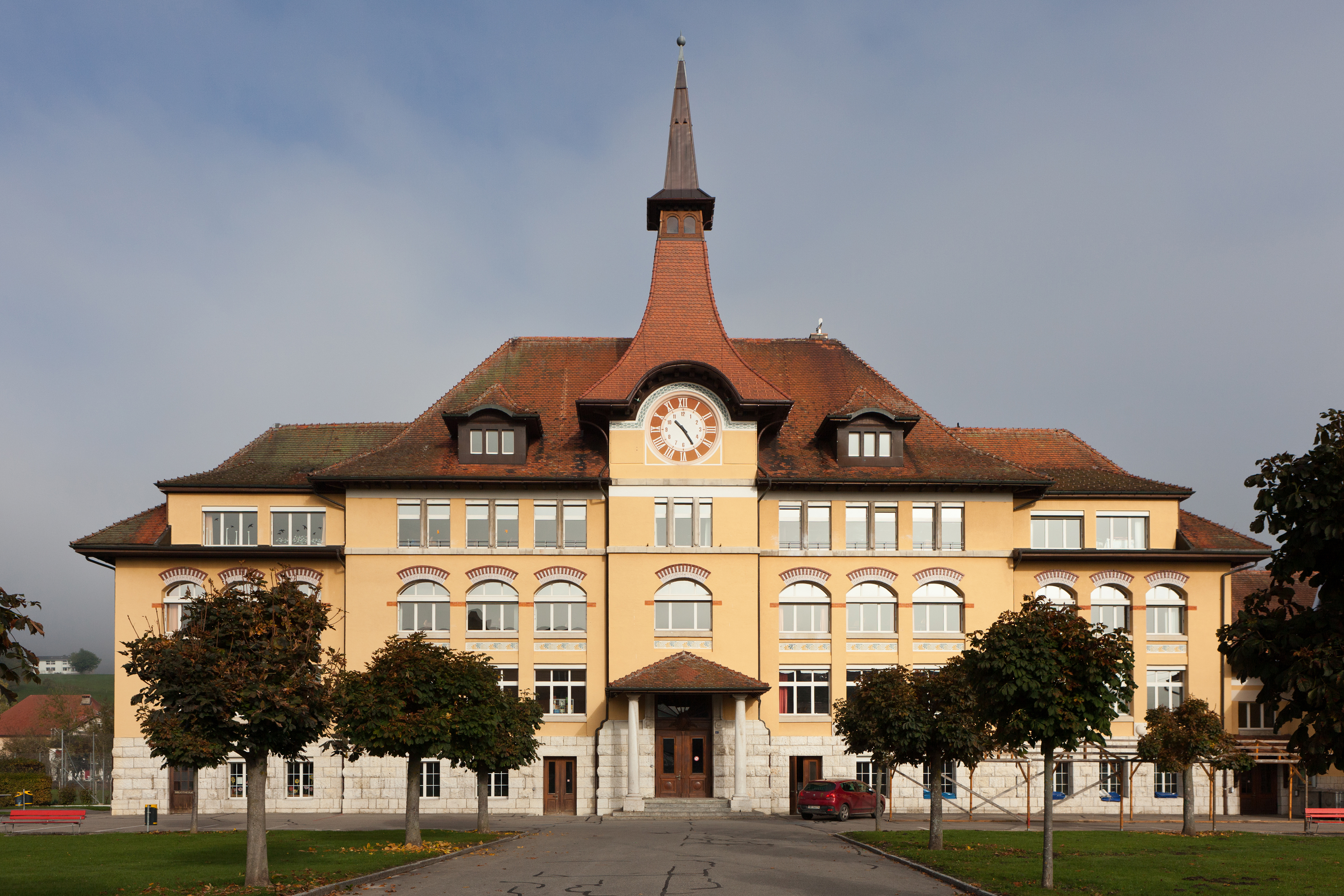
Schoolhouse in Courtelary, Canton Bern, Switzerland, 1908

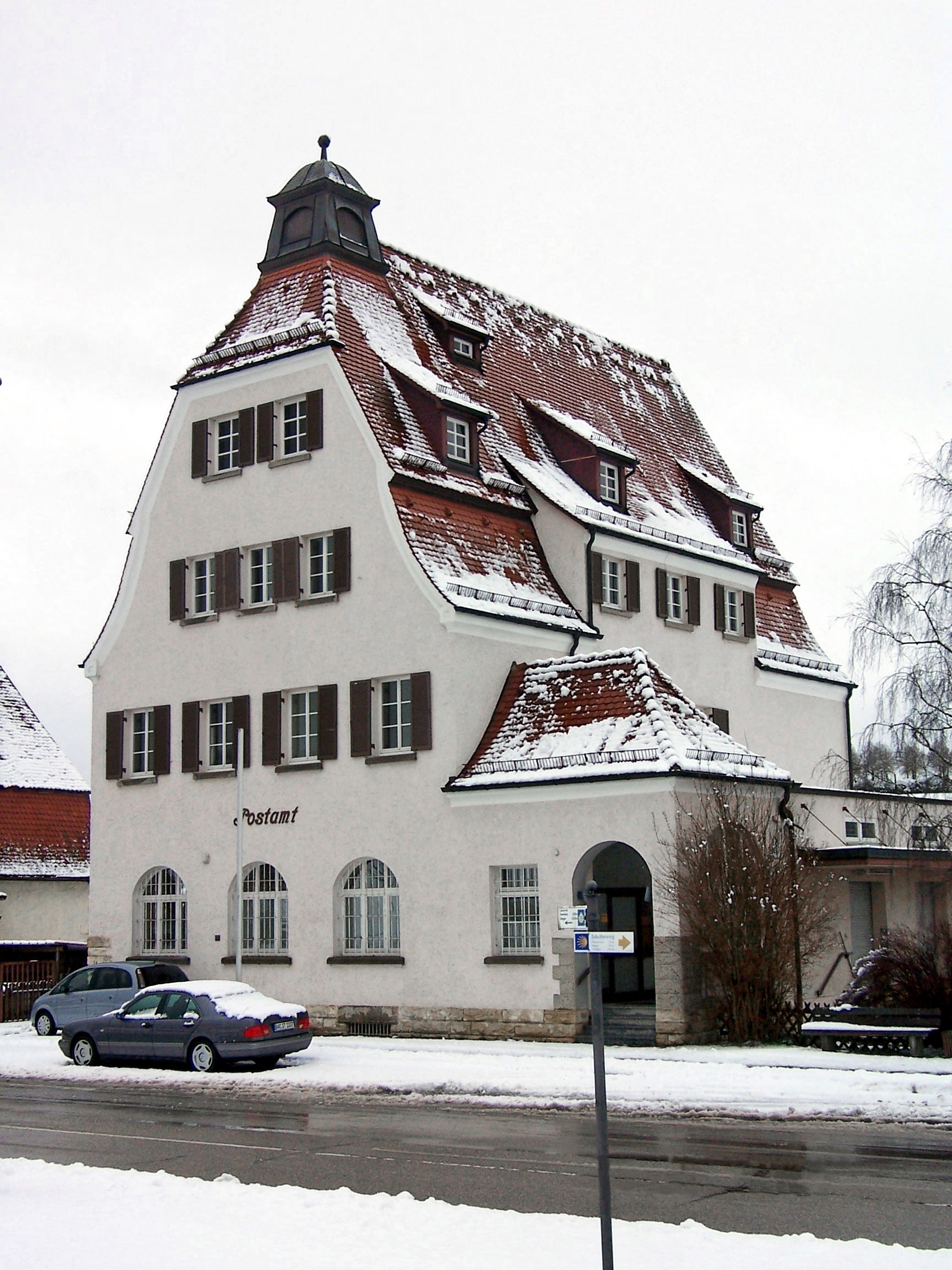
Neresheim Post Office, Baden-Württemberg, 1911

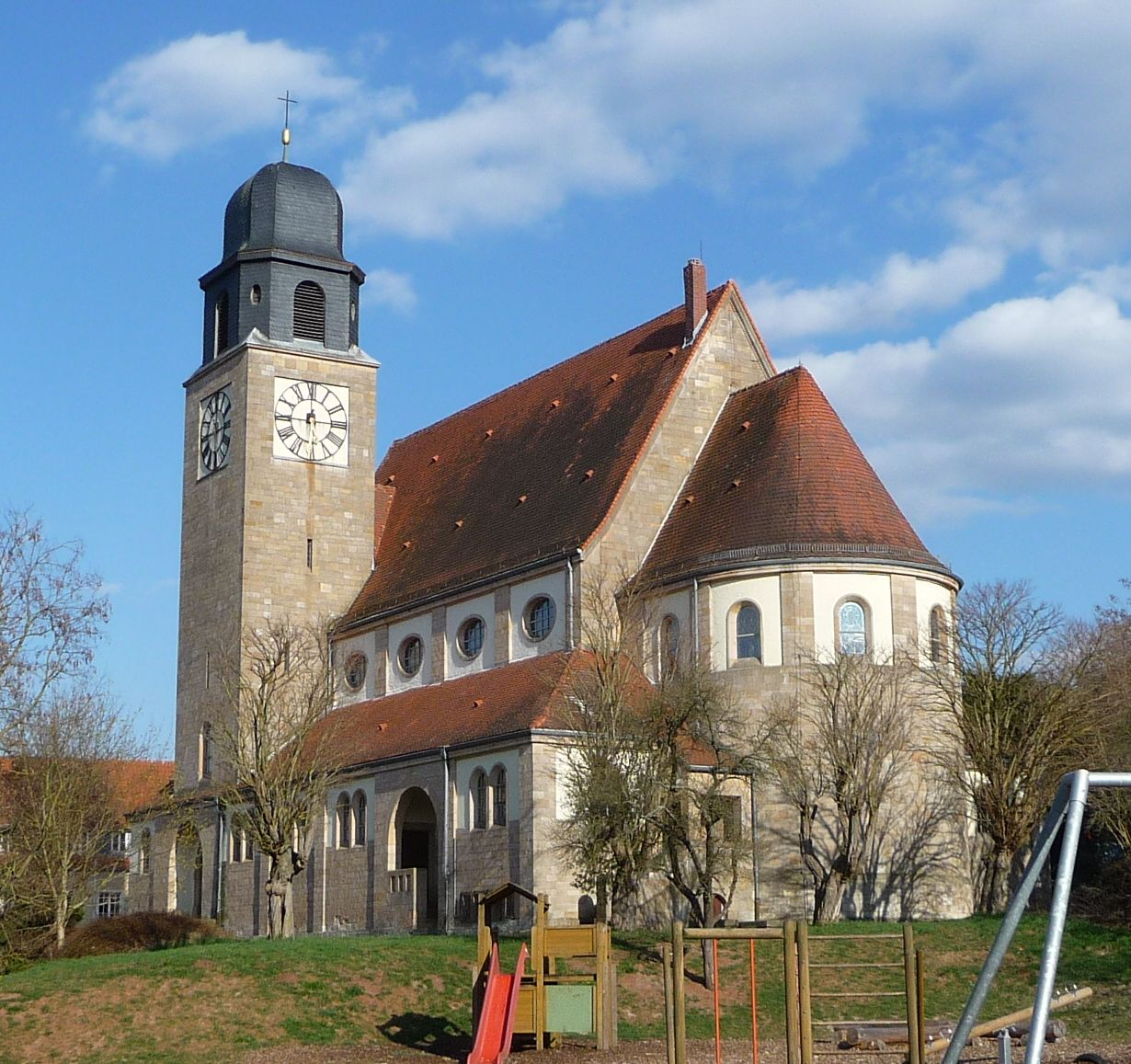
Mariä Himmelfahrt Catholic Church in Ramsen (Pfalz), by Albert Boßlet, 1912

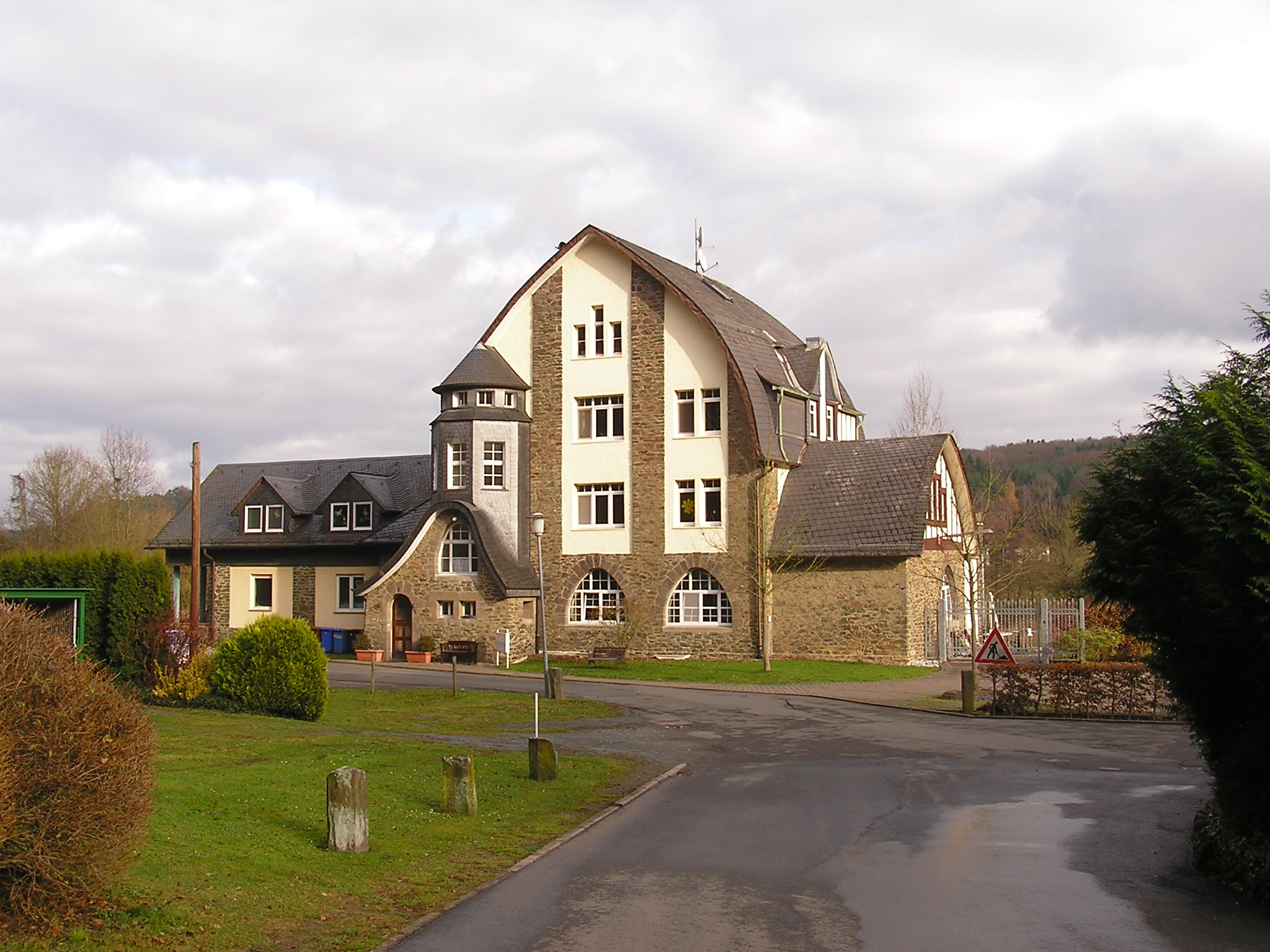
Braunfels-Oberndorf railway station, Solms, Hessen, 1912–13 with Zollingerdach

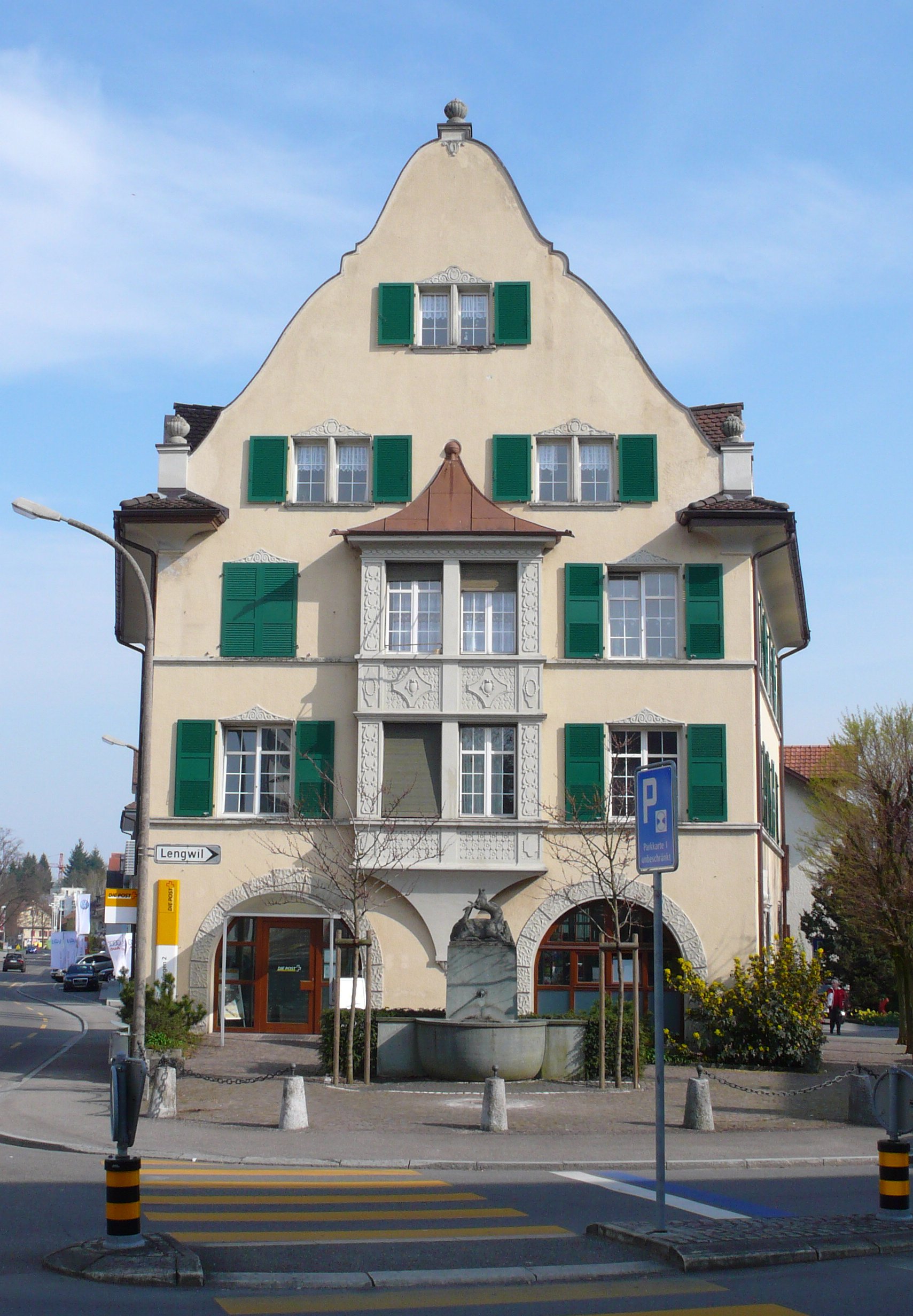
The "Hirschenpost“ in Kreuzlingen, Kanton Thurgau, 1919–20

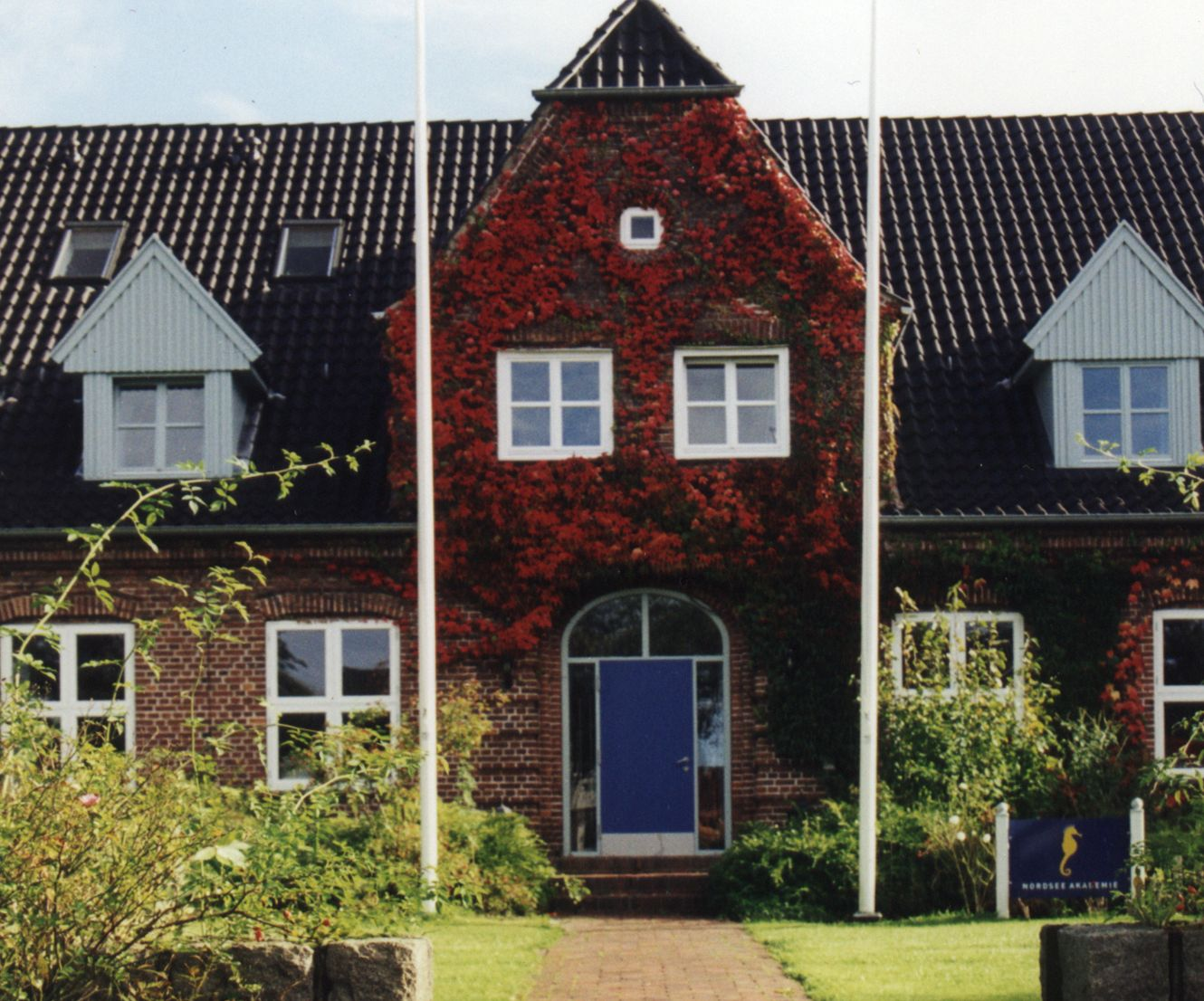
The Nordsee Akademie in Leck, Nordfriesland, 1923

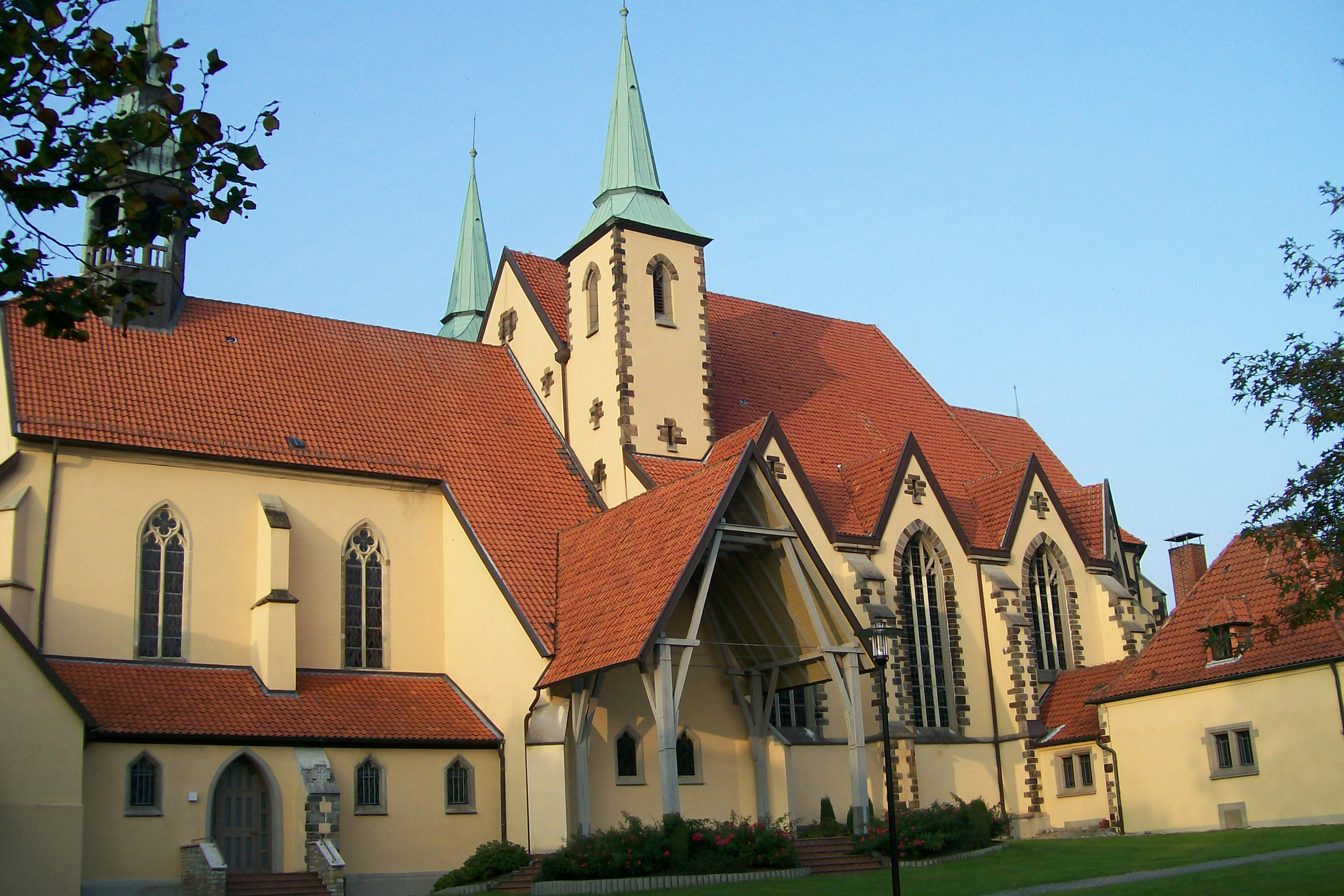
Church at Klosters Rulle in Wallenhorst-Rulle, Lower Saxony, 1927-1930

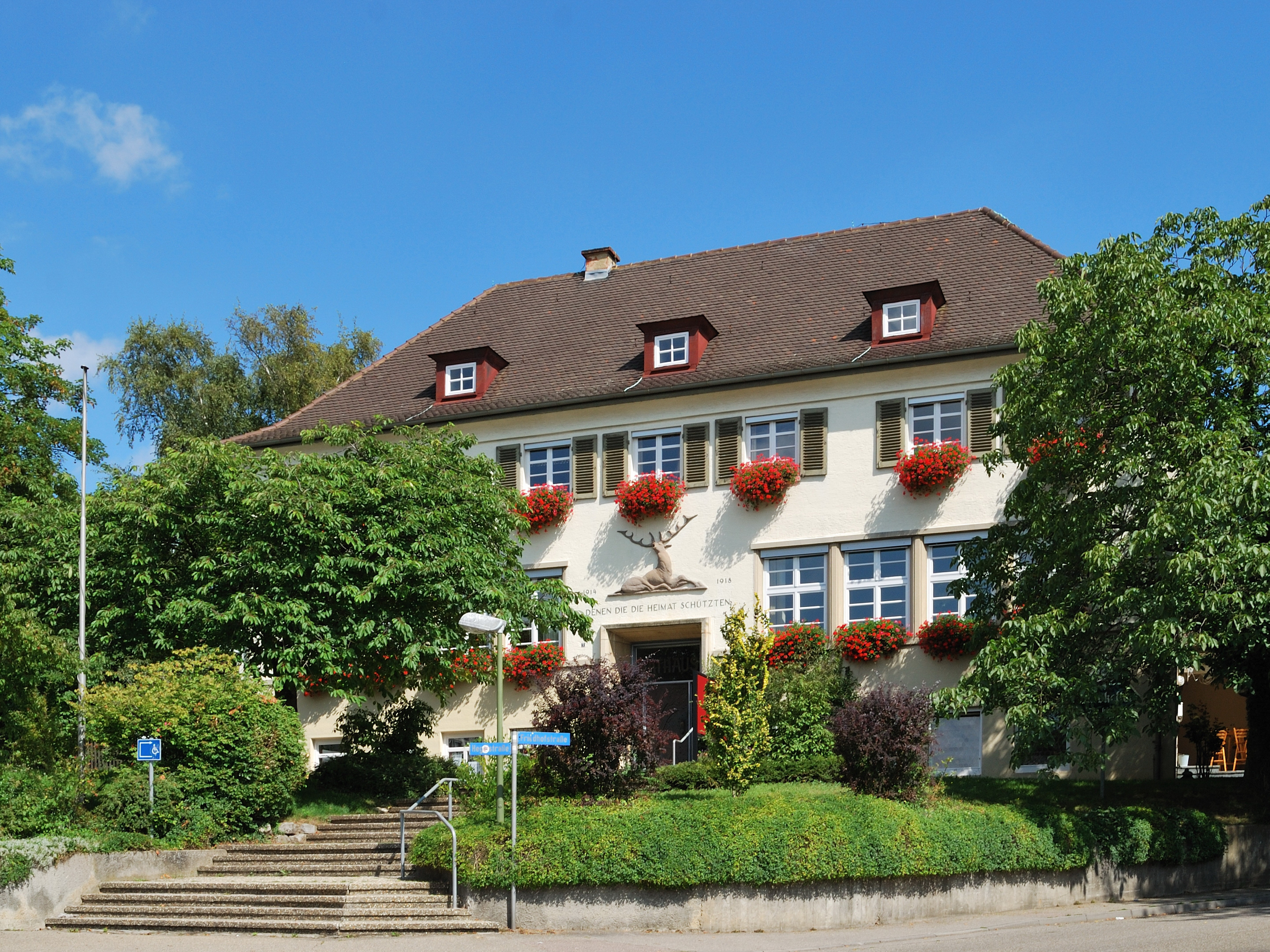
Town Hall in Hirschlanden (Ditzingen), Baden-Württemberg, 1930

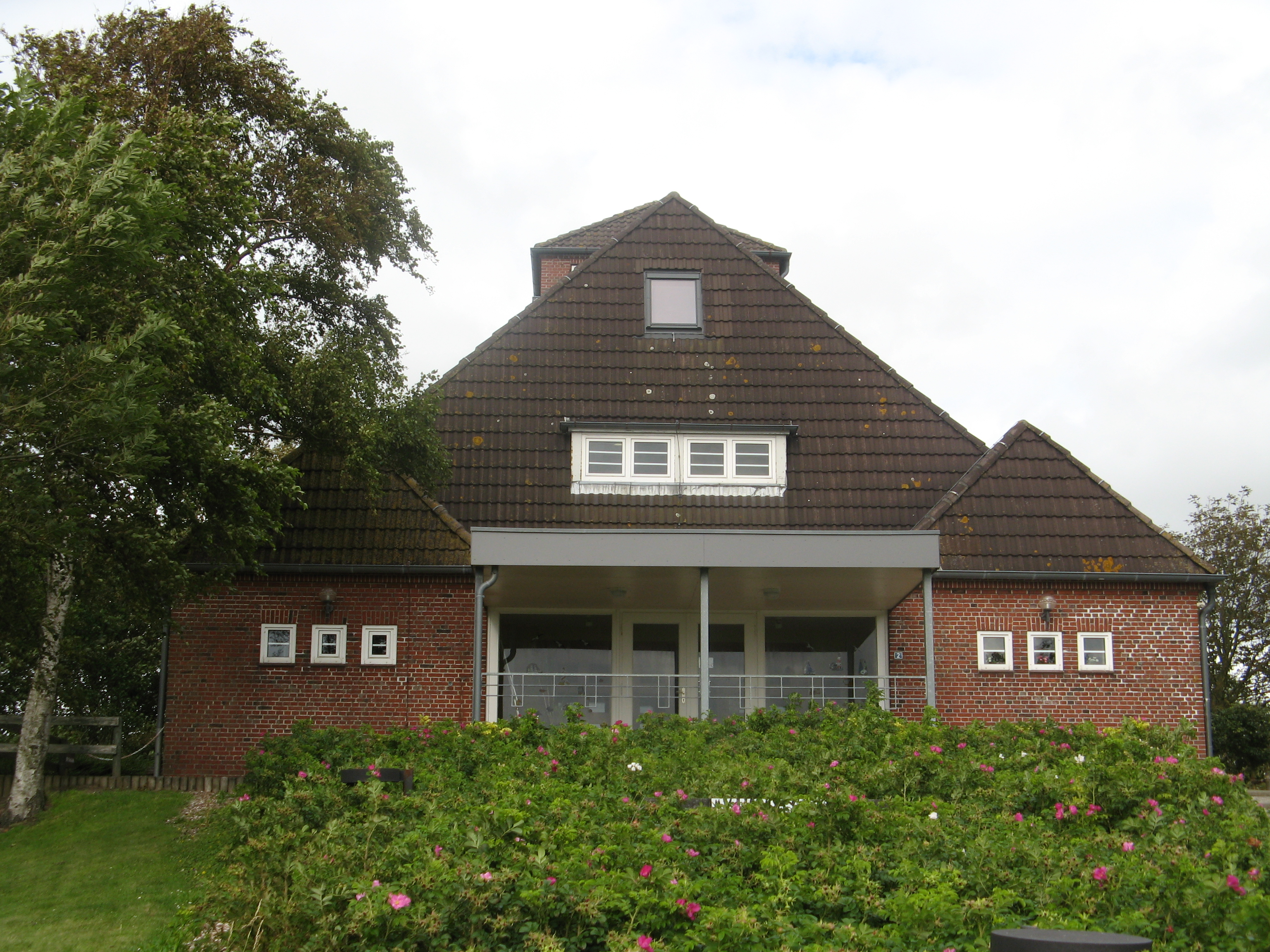
Neulandhalle in Dieksanderkoog, Schleswig-Holstein, 1935, built in Haubarg style

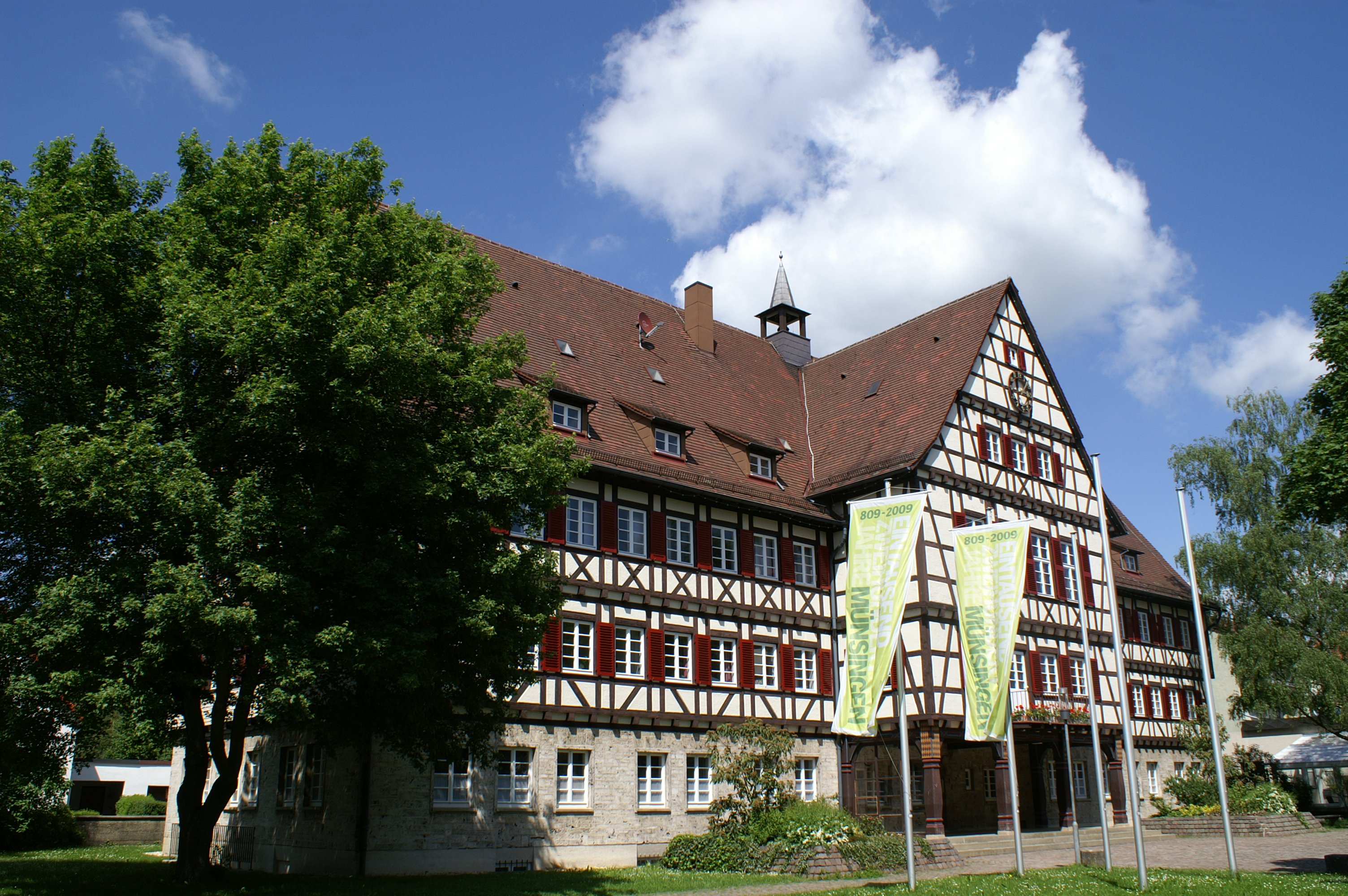
New Town Hall in Münsingen (Württemberg), 1935–1937

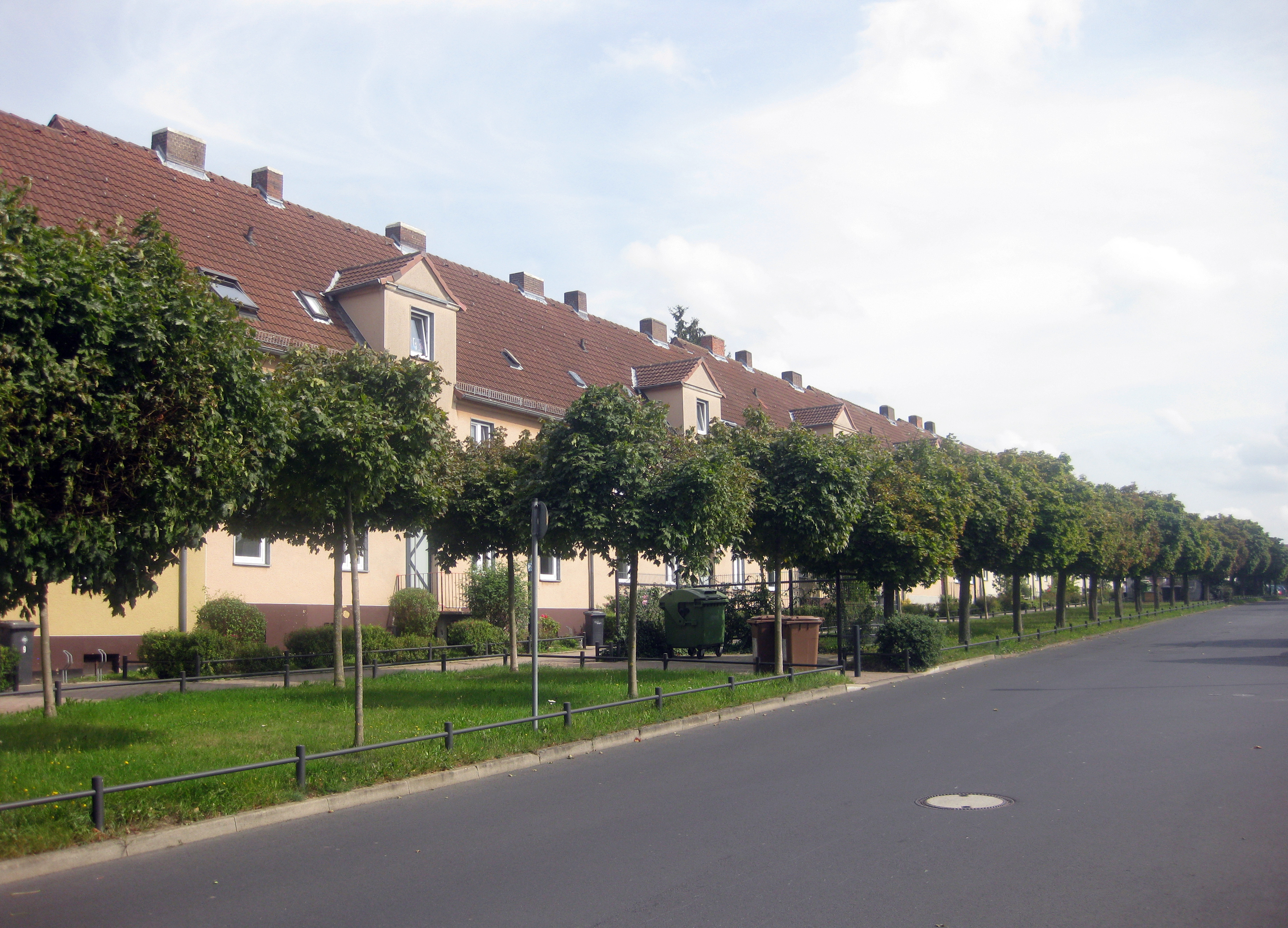
Garden city in Lohfelden, Hesse

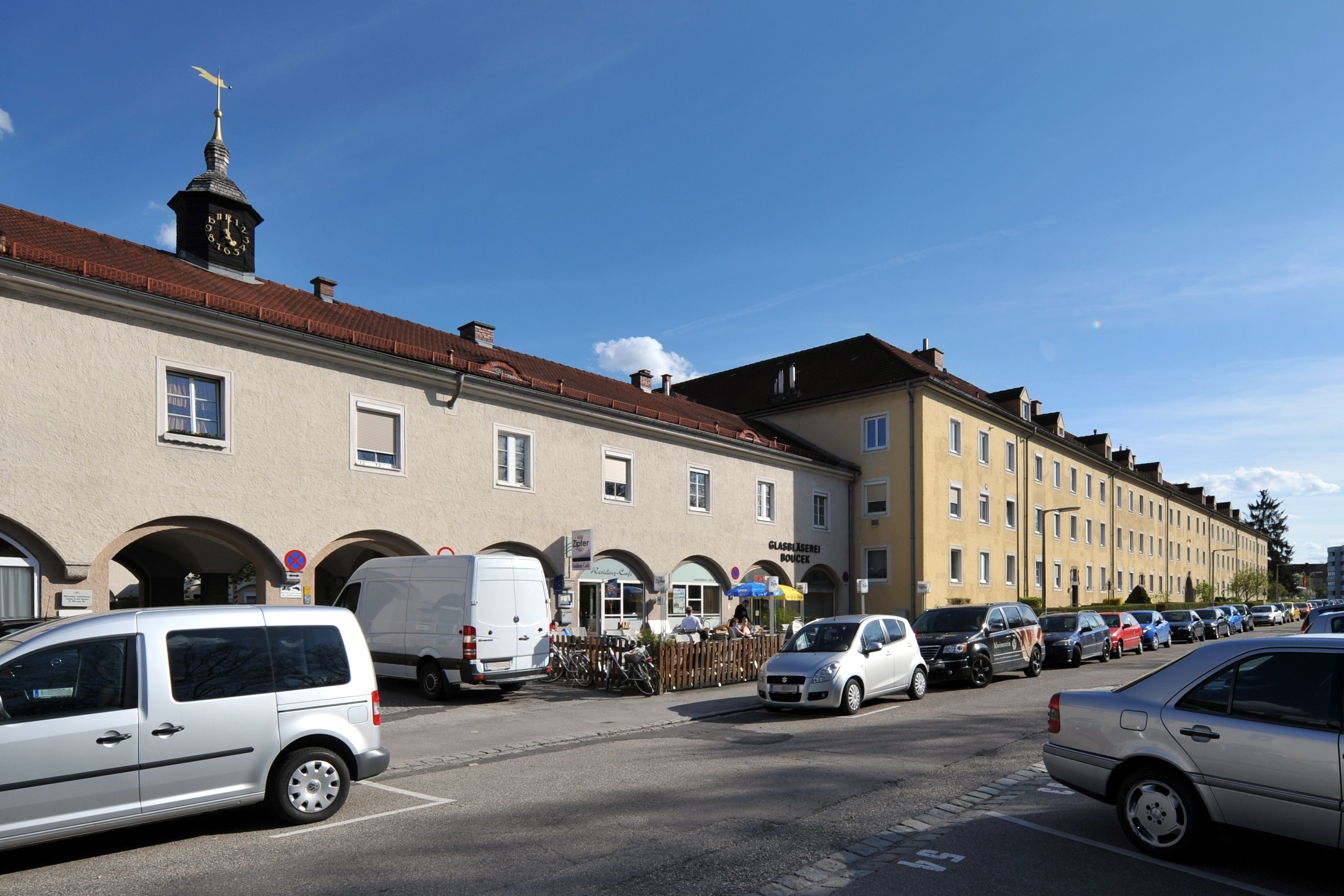
„Hitlerbauten“ in Linz Harbachsiedlung, Oberösterreich, Austria

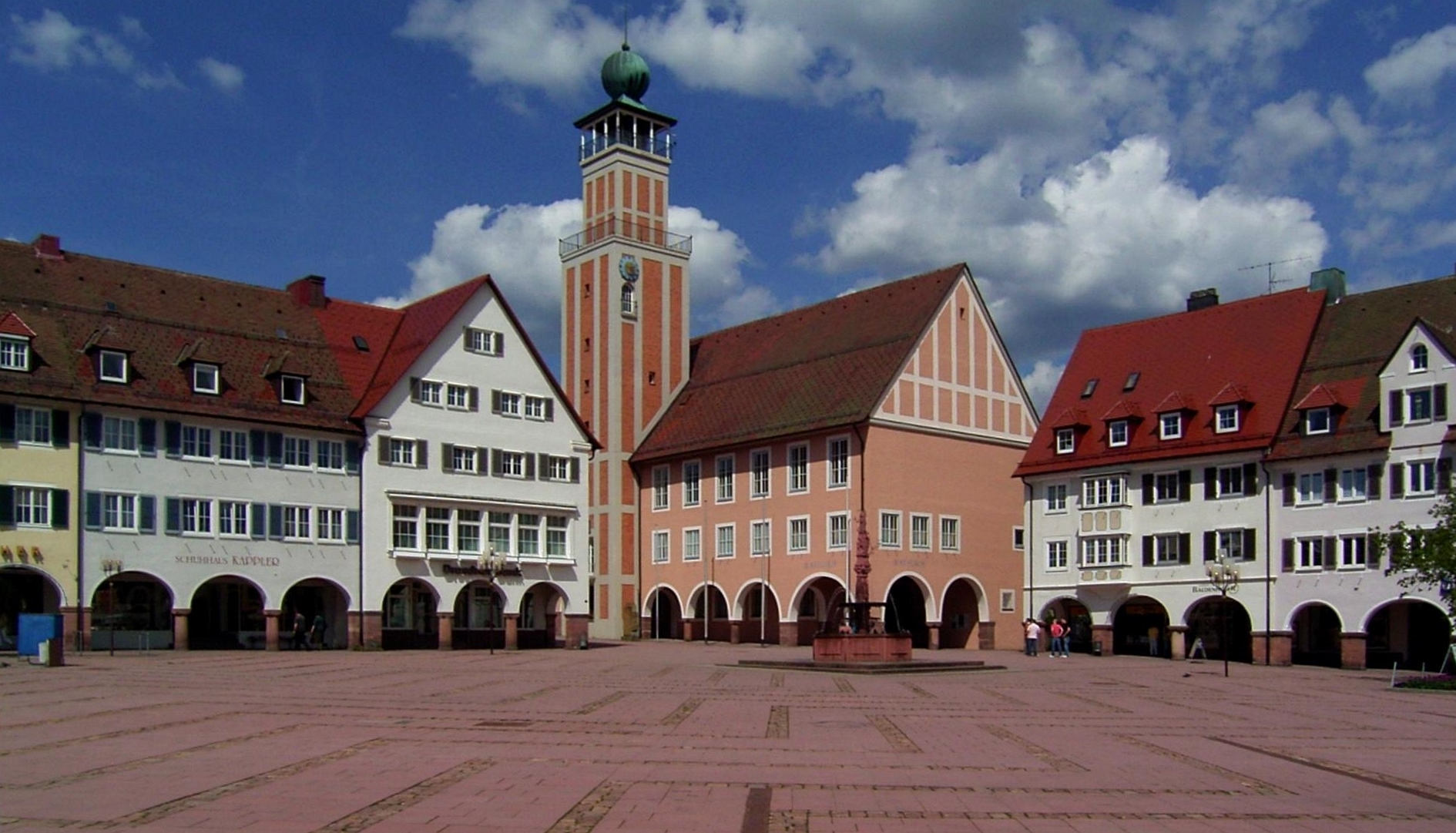
Market Square in Freudenstadt, Baden-Württemberg, 1950
