= Heimat =

German expression

Heimat (German: [ˈhaɪmaːt]) is a German word translating to 'home' or 'homeland'. The word has connotations specific to German culture, German society and specifically German Romanticism, German nationalism, German statehood and regionalism so that it has no exact English equivalent. The word describes a state of belonging "the opposite of feeling alien", and its definition is not limited to a geographical place.

== Definitions ==
There is no single definition for the term "heimat". Bausinger describes it as a spatial and social unit of medium range, wherein the individual is able to experience safety and the reliability of its existence, as well as a place of a deeper trust:

Heimat als Nahwelt, die verständlich und durchschaubar ist, als Rahmen, in dem sich Verhaltenserwartungen stabilisieren, in dem sinnvolles, abschätzbares Handeln möglich ist – Heimat also als Gegensatz zu Fremdheit und Entfremdung, als Bereich der Aneignung, der aktiven Durchdringung, der Verlässlichkeit.

Home is the close environment that is understandable and transparent, as a frame, in which behavioral expectations are met, in which reasonable, expectable action is possible – in contrast to foreignness and alienation, as a sector of aversion, of active saturation, of reliability.

Greverus (1979) focuses especially on the concept of identity. To her, "heimat" is an "idyllic world" and can only be found within the trinity of community, space and tradition; because only there human desires for identity, safety and an active designing of life can be pleased. In any case "heimat", or even better: the examination thereof, is one of several identification sectors creating self-awareness.

In terms of ethnology and anthropology, "heimat" reflects the need for spatial orientation and the first "territory" that can offer identity, stimulation and safety for one's own existence (Paul Leyhausen). From an existentially philosophical perspective, home provides the individual with a spatiotemporal orientation for self-preparation, in opposition to the term of strangeness (Otto Friedrich Bollnow). In terms of sociology, home belongs to the constitutional conditions for group identity in complementarity to strangeness (Georg Simmel).

== Origin of the term ==
The German equivalent of "home" is Heim (Germanic *haim). The feminine noun Heimat is attested around the 11th century (late OHG heimōti n., MGH heimōt(e) f., n.) by way of the suffix *-ōt(i)- expressing a state or condition also found in Monat = month, which became somewhat productive in medieval German (cf. Heirat, Zierat, Kleinod, Einöde). There is a close Gothic cognate haimōþli (for ἀγρός "lands, homestead" in Mark 10, reflected in OHG heimōdili).

The semantic distinction from simple "home" (Heim) at least by the 16th century is that Heim denotes an individual house (or homestead, farmstead inhabited by an extended family) while Heimat denotes the wider homeland (patria) of a people or tribe. It is glossed with patria throughout, and as such is synonymous with Vaterland. Luther translates the phrase "the land of my kindred" (terra nativitatis mea) in Genesis 24:7 as meine Heimat. Use of Heimat in the larger sense of Germany as the homeland of a German nation is first recorded in the 17th century Zincgref, Apophthegmata 1626–1631). The word nevertheless retains the pragmatic sense of habitat (of plants and animals, Philipp Andreas Nemnich), a person's place of birth or permanent residence, and in Upper German (Bavarian and Swiss) also of the house inherited from one's father.

== Exile and utopia ==
Authors, who had to leave their homeland due to their prosecution in the Third Reich described this notion from their memories as realistic as possible. Thomas Mann, Bertolt Brecht, Alfred Döblin, Lion Feuchtwanger, Leonhard Frank, Ludwig Marcuse, Franz Werfel and Stefan Zweig are some well-known examples of such authors.

The term Utopia is also a spatial category as "utopos" literally means "no place". To tie in with the exile literature, homeland can also be described as a notion which isn't reached yet. The concrete utopia is Ernst Bloch's notion of homeland which he created in his main work "The Principle of Hope" (Das Prinzip Hoffnung) during his exile in the United States. Bloch, who opposed war in Wilhelmian Germany in 1914, who had to leave Nazi-Germany in the 1930s as he was a Marxian Jew and who was forced to emigrate from the German Democratic Republic in the 1950s, defines homeland as something beyond class society. That way he summarized "Thesen über Feuerbach" (theses about Feuerbach) by Karl Marx as follows:

"Die vergesellschaftete Menschheit im Bund mit einer ihr vermittelten Natur ist der Umbau der Welt zur Heimat."

"A socialized humanity bound to a sharing nature is the transformation of the world into homeland".

Based on this, Bernhard Schlink evoked once again reconstructive homeland as a utopia. This representation explicitly pushed the notion's part linked to the location away and considers homeland as "non-location": a feeling, a hope, a desire to experience—especially in exile. This idea would be already preformed a long time ago in the Christian representation of the world, in which humanity was in exile on the earth since the fall of mankind.

In 2014 the slogan of the series of events in the occasion of the celebration of peace in Augsburg was: "Homeland? Never been there!” („Heimat? Da war ich noch nie!“)

== Dimensions of Heimat ==
=== Temporal dimension ===
The concept of "Heimat" first emerged in a literary context that was neither religious nor poetic during the period of Industrialization and Romanticism. People moved from the country to the cities to an increasing degree in order to find employment in a factory, which eventually led to urban expansion and the impoverishment of many. The rise of capitalism caused social hierarchies to shift. Prior distinctions of social classes such as aristocracy and peasantry gradually dissolved (due to urban expansion and the rise of capitalism) and were replaced by the conceptions of proletariat and bourgeoisie instead. Those who were at risk of social deprivation perceived the new world order, in which the upper-class was shrinking and there were more industry workers, as something "unheim(at)lich" (literal German translation in the sense of something "unfamiliar" and disconcerting.). The so-called "Heimat-movement" was primarily concerned with a fear of loss of "the good old days" as well as the opposed glorification and idealization of rural life. The "Heimat-movement" thereby sharply opposed the ideas of progress and Enlightenment. In the 19th century, the concept of "Heimat" was thus closely associated with the preindustrial way of life and its tragic downfall. Farmers were regarded as the most pristine and wholesome members of society and fascinated many around 1900, which gave a rise to literary regionalism, a type of formula fiction.

=== Social dimension ===
The term "Heimat" also applies to affiliations with other individuals but also to oneself. The concept of "Heimat" is closely associated with the present—as its meaning is established in a particular moment—and aims to provide an answer to a central question: Am I in the right place? Which place in the world do I want to make my home?”

Ortwin Renn disagrees with the idea that metropolises nowadays cannot be perceived as "Heimat". According to him, we live in an era of industrial mass societies as well as increasing international interdependence. Therefore, he argues that the concept of "Heimat" could not simply be considered a part of pre-modern agricultural societies and idyllic sceneries on the country side. Renn believes that these conceptions were in fact fictional, just as much as mental images of industrialized cities and areas with high population density.

From a sociological point of view, anyone without social roots can be considered "heimatlos" in some way. A geographical distance from the place of birth or the current residence is not required for this form of "Heimatlosigkeit". The feeling of being uprooted can arise due to a changing landscape in a once familiar environment, through new- or reconstruction of buildings and streets, through societal changes and by devaluation of one's acquired competences throughout life.

=== Cultural dimension ===
In the 1950s and the first half of the 1960s, many so-called movies about the concept of "Heimat" ("Heimatfilm") were made, which are attributed to trivial entertainment. This aspect can not be assigned to all "Heimatfilme" (a movie genre about the concept of Heimat) nevertheless, especially to the "Heimatfilme" in the 1970s up until now. The movie trilogy "Heimatbild" by Edgar Reitz in particular, made in 1984 to 2004, conveyed a new, differentiated concept of "Heimat" by incorporating as few clichés of the ideal world as possible.

Staying in touch with one's "Heimat" ("Heimatpflege") is primarily done in associations; in very few states it is organized by the government. The respective associations try to maintain the "Heimatpflege" tradition, a cultural asset that needs to be held up. However, museums dealing with the issue of "Heimat" promote local tourism by presenting folklore, no matter how accurate their display of the region is. Cultural possessions, traditional clothing for instance, are oftentimes worn in front of a paying audience, but not in a private environment.

In Germany, most of the "Heimat" associations dealing with the authentic display of specific regional clothing are connected to the German society for traditional costumes based in Munich. More than 2 Million members belong to this association, among them also 200.000 young adults and children. Their (financial) supporters often play an active part within the local community, especially in rural communities. Regional traditional costumes are worn in respect to contemporary demands and needs for clothing. The background history of a certain region or location in the sense of "Heimat" as a cultural identity considers the history of "Heimat" or the ethnology ("Volkskunde"). This is documented in "Heimat" museums.

=== Emotional dimension ===
Today, "Heimat" is considered a subjective emotion, not necessarily related to political or legal definitions. It is made up of the individual mindset one has about a certain place, society or just the individual's development. Losing one's "Heimat" or even just the fear of that occurring, presents as "Heimweh". To those who lost or left their "Heimat", the term can become synonymous with "home country". It is possible to choose one's own "Heimat" from a selection of places. However, "Heimat" can also be lost through a natural disaster or a radical change by human intervention.

A guest contribution by Oliver Kontny in the programme to the "Augsburger Hohes Friedensfest" 2014 that had "Heimat? Never been there before" as its motto also treats this subject. Kontny indicates, that only very few cities have the same significance to those that were raised there and later returned as adults. This is due to the cities' structural alteration into spaces, in which excess capital can produce even more income return, he says (orig. German: "Städte umgebaut [werden] zu Räumen, in denen überschüssiges Kapital noch mehr Rendite abwerfen kann"), which makes it hard for many of them to have feelings of "Heimat". It is quite frankly impossible to live in the same city twice, even if it's all one has ever done, adds Kontny (orig. German: "nicht zweimal in derselben Stadt leben, und wenn man sein Leben lang nichts anderes täte"). "People come for personal reasons or to find work, but then they stay because they can't get away from all the parties and alcohol." Without diversity management it is difficult to convey a sense of "Heimat" to immigrants according to their new place of residence.

When we speak of language as a cultural "Heimat", talk is of an exiled German author, who names the German language or German literature his home. "Heimat" as a way of life describes the creed of a seaman: "My home is the ocean".

== Modern history ==
In the 19th century, Heimat acquired strong emotional connotations in the context of both German Romanticism and German nationalism (but also patriotism based on regional identity).

The concept of a (typically rural, idyllic) native homeland as an expression of identity in the context of the exodus from rural areas into more urbanised communities (Landflucht) during the Industrial Revolution can be seen as a reaction to the onset of modernity, loss of individuality and intimate community.

The state shall edge away where we love our Heimat—Kurt Tucholsky, 1929

The specific aspects of Heimat—love and attachment to homeland—left the idea vulnerable to easy assimilation into the fascist "blood and soil" literature of the National Socialists. It was conceived by the National Socialists (Nazis) that the Volk community is deeply rooted in the land of their Heimat through their practice of agriculture and their ancestral lineage going back hundreds and thousands of years. The Third Reich was regarded at the deepest level as the sacred Heimat of the unified Volk community—the national slogan was One Reich, One Volk, One Führer. Those who were taken to Nazi concentration camps were those who were officially declared by the SS to be "enemies of the volk community" and thus a threat to the integrity and security of the heimat.

The contemporary conception of Heimat is most readily seen in the Heimatfilm from the Heimat period c. 1946–1965, in which filmmakers placed a profound emphasis on nature and the provincial homeliness of Germany. Forests, mountains, landscapes, and rural areas portrayed Germany in a homely light with which the German people readily identified.

In 1984, Edgar Reitz released his film Heimat, highlighting the provincial sense of belonging and the conflict that exists between urban and rural life.

Alon Confino, in his book Germany as a Culture of Remembrance: Promises and Limits of Writing History (2006) sees the post-war concept of Heimat as having emerged as a reaction to Germany's self-imposed position on the world stage, a symptom of the forced introversion following the world wars, and an attempt at individual distancing from responsibility for Nazi Germany's actions.

A group of researchers from Max Planck Society discovered a dense gas cloud in the molecular cloud Sagittarius B2, known as the Large Molecule Heimat.

== Heimatschutz ==
Heimatschutz is the German term for "protection of national heritage". The so-called "Heimatschutzarchitektur" or Heimatschutzstil is an architectural style that was first described in 1904 and was practised until the late 1960s. Its goal was to embed buildings into their regional cultural environment by referencing local design features, such as materials, proportions and shapes. Unlike the historism found in the 19th century, Heimatschutz did not embrace ornate and decorative elements and tried to reinterpret traditional techniques and regional design languages in a clean and modern way. The German association for Heimatschutz, the Deutsche Bund für Heimatschutz, was founded in Dresden in 1904 with a focus on built heritage conservation and the furtherance of traditional crafts and techniques.

== Support in international law ==
In international law the "right to one's homeland" (German: Recht auf die Heimat; French: droit au foyer; Italian: diritto alla Patria; Spanish: derecho a la patria) is a concept that has been gaining acceptance as a fundamental human right and a precondition to the exercise of the right to self-determination. In 1931 at the Académie de Droit International in The Hague (Hague Academy of International Law), Robert Redslob spoke of the right to the homeland in connection with the right to self-determination in Le principe des nationalités.

Georges Scelle in Belgium, Felix Ermacora in Austria, Alfred de Zayas in the United States, and Christian Thomuschat and Dieter Blumenwitz in Germany are amongst those who have written extensively on the subject.

The first United Nations High Commissioner for Human Rights Jose Ayala Lasso of Ecuador affirmed this right, which is reflected in the 13-point Declaration appended to the Final Report on "Human Rights and Population Transfers".

== From traditionalistic "Heimat" to modern "Umwelt" ==
After 1945 the German way of thinking about the environment was transformed from traditionalistic "Heimat" to modern "Umwelt". "Heimat" goes back centuries and evokes emotional, cultural, and national identity tied to a specific landscape or region. In the 19th and early 20th centuries, it was often linked to romanticized notions of nature and even nationalist ideologies. "Umwelt" is a more modern, scientific ecological approach that emphasizes the environment as a system of interactions between humans and nature, grounded in science and global awareness.

== See also ==
- Hiraeth
- Homeland
- Urheimat
- Culture of Remembrance

== Bibliography ==
- Applegate, Celia (1990). A Nation of Provincials: The German Idea of Heimat. Berkeley. ISBN 978-0520063945.
- Ladenthin, Volker (1991). "Jeder Mensch ist heimatberechtigt". Neue Zürcher Zeitung. Vol. 301/91, no. 28–29 December 1991. p. 19.
- Schmitz, Rainer (2022). Heimat. Volkstum. Architektur: Sondierungen zum volkstumsorientierten Bauen der Heimatschutz-Bewegung im Kontext der Moderne und des Nationalsozialismus. Bielefeld 2022. ISBN 978-3837658507.
- Stone, Dan (1997). "Homes Without Heimats? Jean Améry at the limits". Angelaki. 2 (1): 91–100. doi:10.1080/09697259708571918.
- Jens Jäger: Heimat, version: 1, in: Docupedia Zeitgeschichte, 13. August 2018
