= Dieksanderkoog =

Coordinates: 53°58′N 8°55′E

Dieksanderkoog, formerly Adolf-Hitler-Koog was new land (1,330 hectares, or 3,285 acres) created by dikes as a Work Creation measure in Dithmarschen, Germany during the Nazi era. The new land contained many Haubarg farmhouses, which were entirely atypical to the region, but were built there to "Germanize" the land. The "Neuland Hall" was built as the primary gathering place for residents of the newly constructed town in 1937.

== Bibliography ==
- Christian Zentner, Friedemann Bedürftig (1991). The Encyclopedia of the Third Reich. Macmillan, New York. ISBN 0-02-897502-2
