= Haubarg =

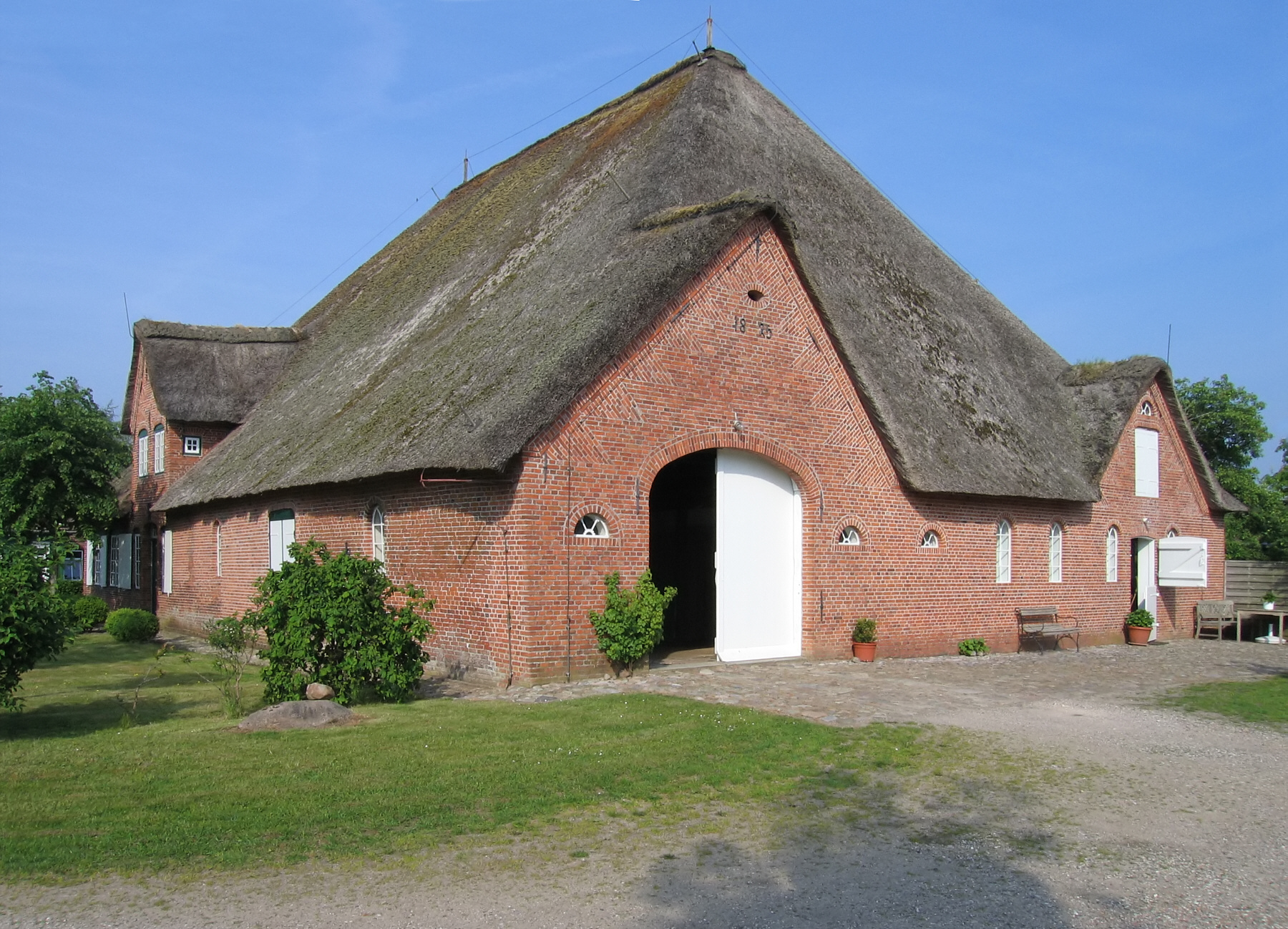
The former Hof Jacobs in Seeth, Nordfriesland district

A Haubarg, rarely also Hauberg, is the typical farmhouse of the Eiderstedt peninsula on the northwest coast of Germany and is a type of Gulf house. It emerged in the late 16th century when West Frisian immigrants brought with them the Gulf type of farm building and it continued to be used until the late 19th century. In the Netherlands these houses are called stolpboerderij.

The word "Haubarg" means a place for piling or stacking hay (see hooiberg). As a byre-dwelling, man and animal lived for centuries in haubargs under one roof, albeit in separate rooms.

== Design ==
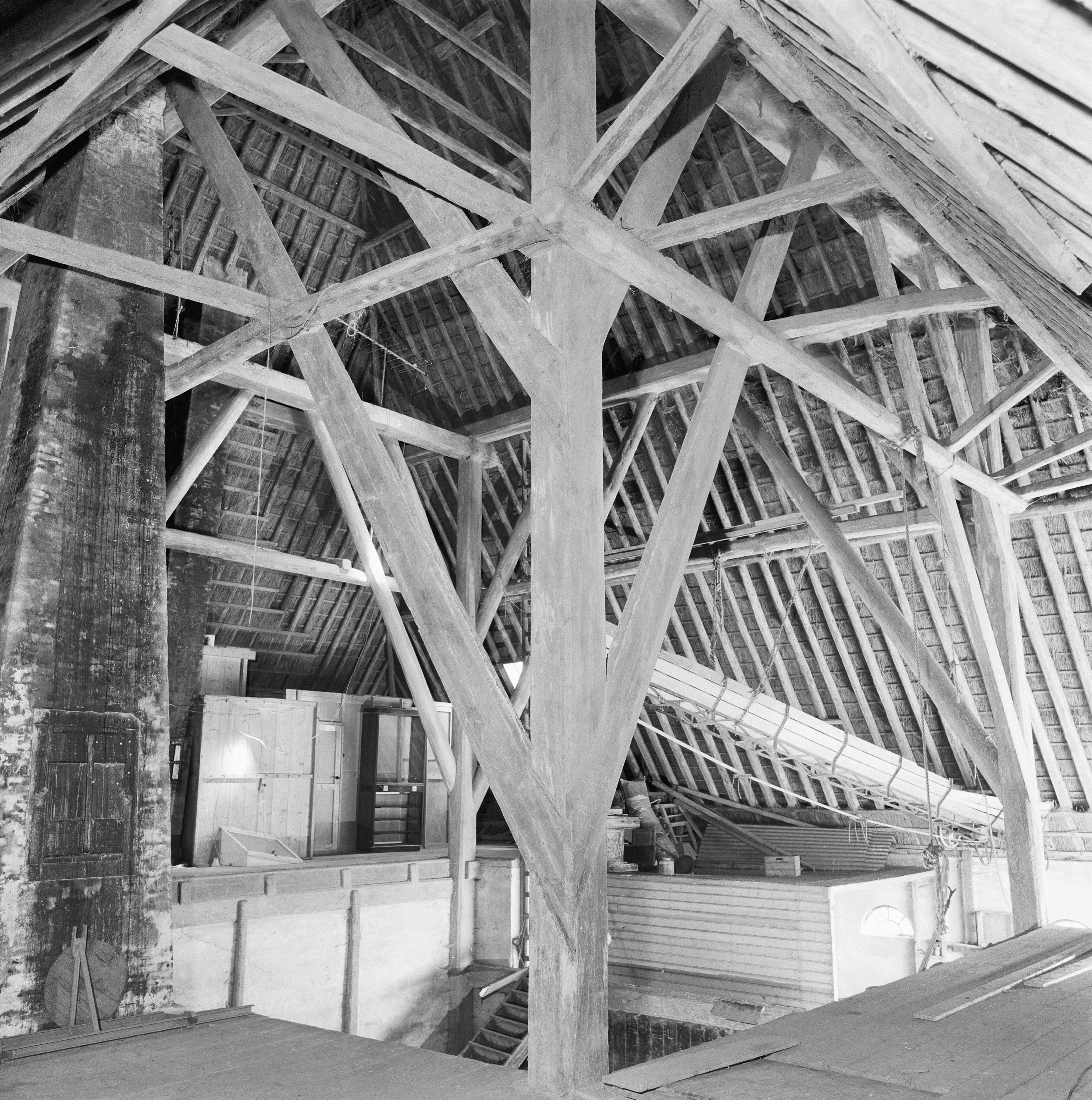
The core area framing of a Haubarg

Haubargs have a right-angled floor plan, which is square in the case of four-post buildings. They are post-and-beam houses, a form of Ständerhaus, in which the house is supported on, usually four, but sometimes six or eight posts, depending on size, that are joined by longitudinal and transverse beams (Pfetten). In rare cases, no longer seen today, there were as many as ten posts. This method of construction meant, inter alia, that the house was resistant to the forces of nature, especially storms and their associated surges. Even if a storm surge collapses the walls, the posts will still support the roof. The basic structure of the house remains undamaged. This design also simplified the renovation of the walls, which began to 'salt out' after about 100 years and had to be replaced.

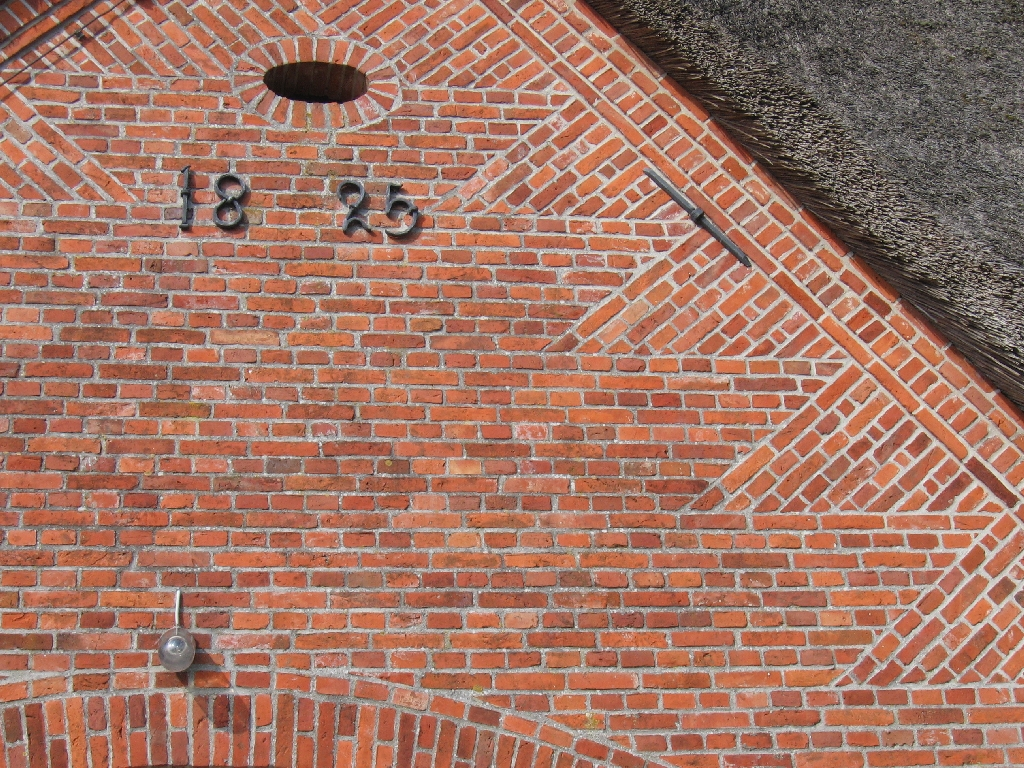
Façade detail on the former Hof Jacobs with "sawtooth pattern" and cross-hatched brickwork

The four posts in the centre of a Haubarg form a square or Vierkant, in which the straw, which was produced by threshing, was stored. Arranged around it are the Loo, where threshing and other activities took place, living rooms (Döns) and sleeping compartments (alcoves or Alkoven) for the farm hands (Hofgesinde) together with the stalls for the horses (Peerboos), cattle (Boos) and small livestock. The bedchambers of well-to-do farmer and his family were wall bed in alcoves in the so-called Pesel, which could even be heated, whereas the farm labourers were only kept warm by the cattle and the stored straw and hay.

The hay, which gave this type of house its name, was kept above the Boos, whilst grain was stored over the living area of the house. Before being threshed, sheaves from the harvest were stacked above the Loo on a sort of slatted floor (Spaltenboden). Outside the harvest season, the Loo acted as a shed for wagons.

Another feature is the thatched roof, often 15 or 20 metres high, under which hay for the winter was stored.

== Location ==
Where coastal defences were inadequate, haubargs were built on artificial mounds, called warfts, to protect them against flooding during storm surges. Until the 18th century, haubargs were built in an east-west direction, then, mostly for representational reasons, in a south-north orientation.

== Recent history and present ==
No new haubargs have been built for about 100 years. When the then Adolf Hitler Koog was dyked in Dithmarschen during the Nazi era, in order to create a model Germanic settlement (Mustersiedlung) there, the houses built were haubargs, entirely atypical of Dithmarschen.

In 1860 there were still 360 haubargs, but by 2008 only about 100 were left. Although haubargs had originally been built for their economic usefulness, they had since become too expensive for their rural owners. The thatched roof in particular, that often had an area of around 1,000m², was very expensive to maintain. As a result, most farmers have moved into other buildings to continue farming. The haubargs have mostly been sold to other, non-local owners, who preserve the exterior appearance, but often carry out major conversions of the interior into other uses. Some haubargs in private hands may be viewed from inside as well.

The best known historic haubarg is the Roter Haubarg, with 99 windows, in the vicinity of Witzwort. In addition to a restaurant, it houses a museum in its historic rooms which offers an insight into the life and work of its former owners. The Tofthof in Westerhever is one of the few haubargs, that has been used for farming since 2005. The sociologist, Ferdinand Tönnies, was born in the haubarg of Die Riep near Oldenswort.

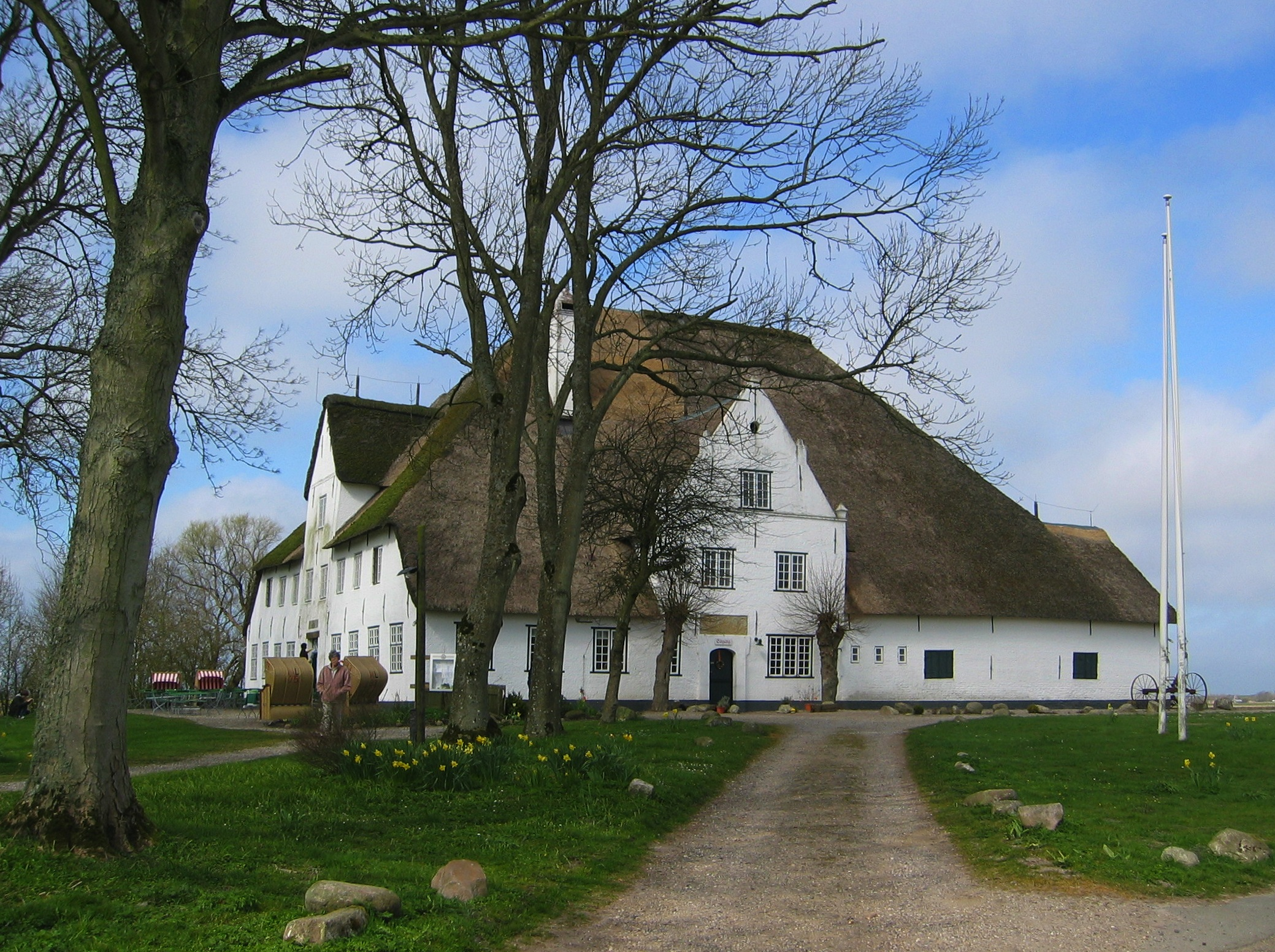
The Roter Haubarg near Witzwort

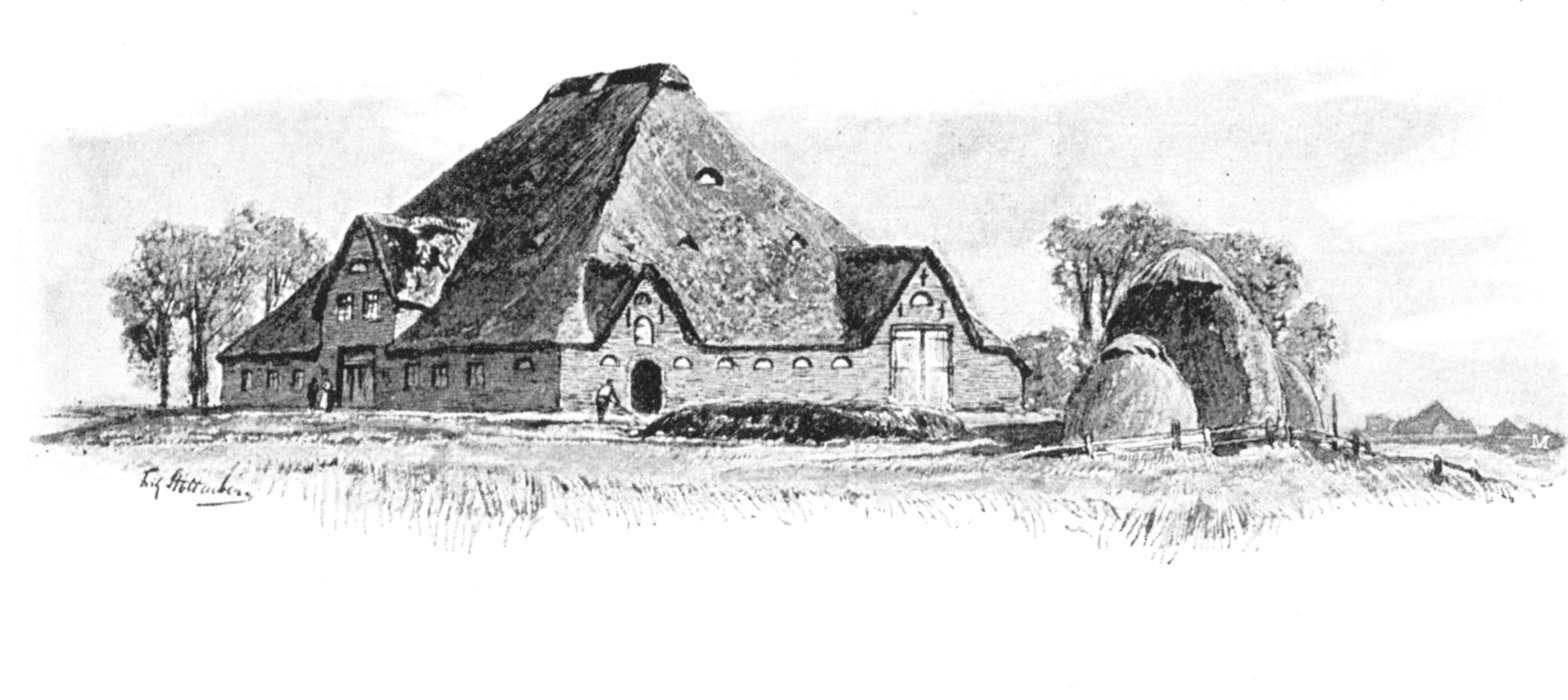
A hauberg on the Eiderstedt peninsula around 1895

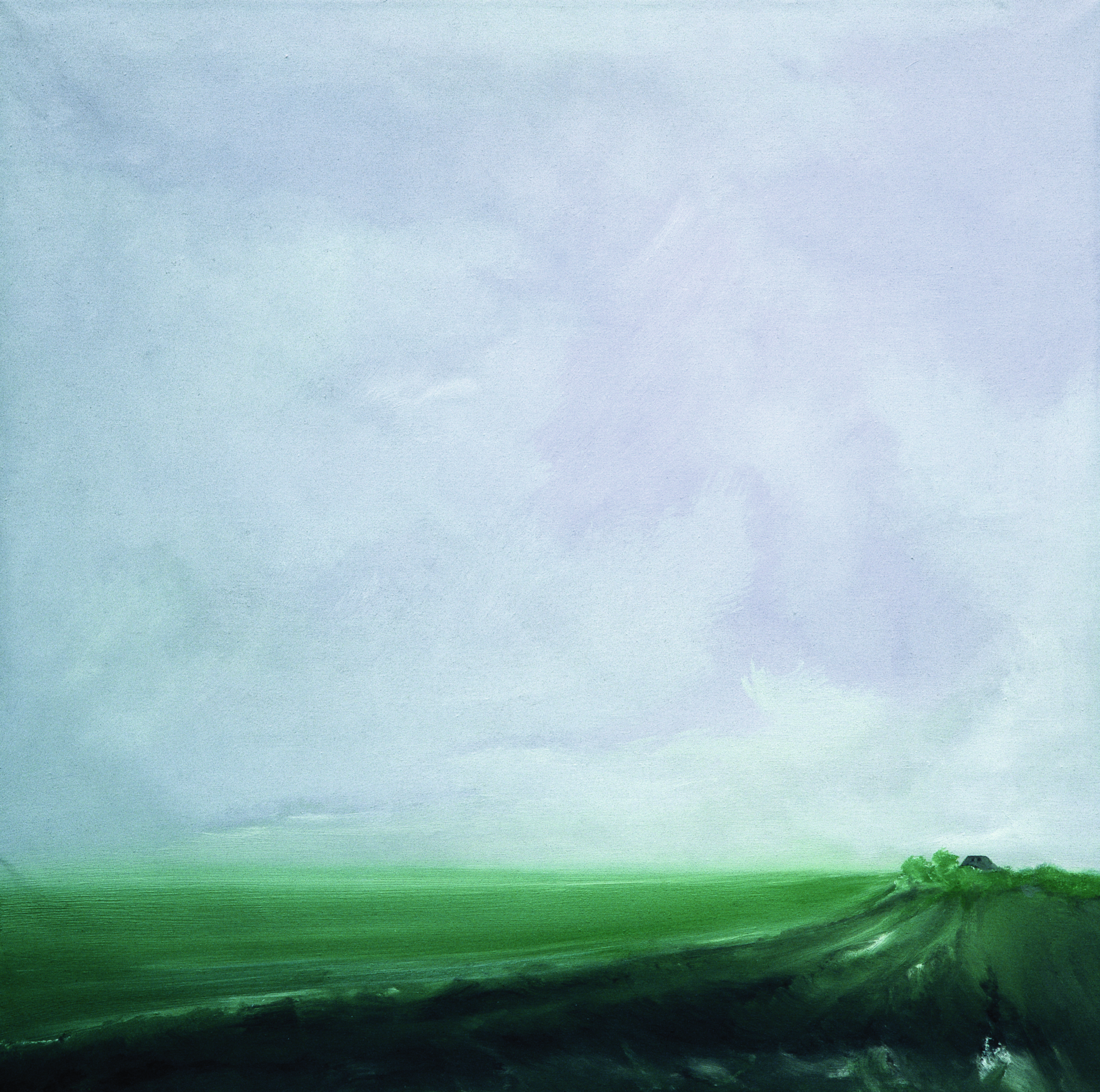
"Haubarg", oil painting by Ingo Kühl, 1983

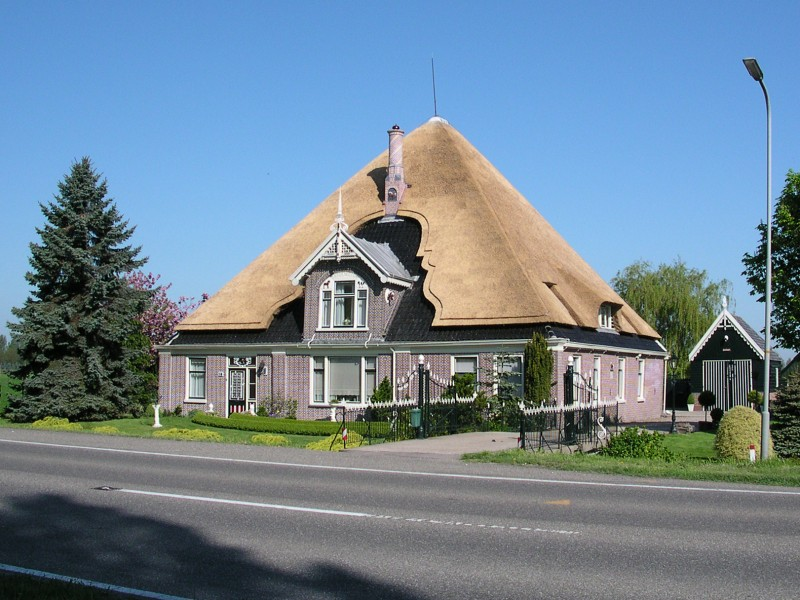
A Dutch stolpboerderij in De Hout, Drechterland
