= Philipp Andreas Nemnich =

German encyclopaedist, lexicographer and writer

Philipp Andreas Nemnich (1764–1822) was a German encyclopaedist, lexicographer and travel writer.

== Biographical summary ==
Nemnich was born at Dillenburg in Nassau, Germany on 3 January 1764. He became a Licentiate in Law (I.U.L. or J.U.L. = Juris Utriusque Licentiatus) at the University of Giessen in 1786 and shortly afterwards took up residence in Hamburg where he remained for the rest of his life. He was a prolific writer in the contemporary press, but is best remembered for a number of encyclopaedic dictionaries and travel reports which he wrote and published over the following thirty years.

The first of these was his Allgemeines Polyglotten-Lexicon der Natur-Geschichte (Universal polyglot dictionary of natural history). It takes the form of a list of German terms in all branches of natural history with their corresponding terms in eight other European languages. It was published in parts, comprising in all about 2,400 pages, between 1793 and 1798. With the exception of the first part, all were published by Nemnich himself, a practice that he was frequently to adopt with subsequent publications. This was followed by a commercial dictionary in twelve languages, the Waaren-lexicon (Dictionary of wares) of 1797–1802. In parallel with the German edition an English version (for which subscriptions were solicited in the press in 1796) was also prepared for the British market and published in December 1798.

In 1799 Nemnich undertook the first of his two visits to Britain during both of which he was particularly concerned with its trade and industries. His original object had been to collect material for a series of articles in the Allgemeine Zeitung, the newspaper that had been started the previous year by the Tübingen printer and publisher, Johann Friedrich Cotta. As it turned out, however, his visit provided him with enough material for a book of over 500 pages. It was published by Cotta in 1800 as Beschreibung einer im Sommer 1799 von Hamburg nach u. durch England geschehenen Reise (Description of a journey made in the summer of 1799 from Hamburg to and through England).

Two further polyglot dictionaries followed, the Lexicon nosologicum polyglotton omnium morborum … , a medical dictionary in ten languages, published by Nemnich himself in 1801, and the Comtoir-Lexicon in Neun Sprachen of 1803. Again, an English version of the latter was prepared; it was printed in Hamburg and published in 1803 as Counting house lexicon in nine languages.

Nemnich paid a second visit to Britain in 1805–06. He was better prepared this time with 1,200 letters of introduction and had publicly invited the submission of questions on matters which could usefully be investigated. This visit resulted in his Neueste Reise durch England, Schottland, und Ireland, hauptsächlich in Bezug auf Produkte, Fabriken, und Handlung (Recent journeys through England, Scotland and Ireland, especially in connection with products, works and commerce). Despite the title of the book, Nemnich also took in Wales where he was obviously fascinated by the Welsh language. Like the earlier account of his British travels, this too was published by Cotta in 1807.

In 1808 he made the first of several similar journeys during the course of which he investigated the industries of the Netherlands, France, Italy and Switzerland. His findings appeared in a series of eight volumes as Tagebuch einer der Kultur und Industrie gewidmeten Reise (Diary of a journey devoted to culture and industry) with publication by Cotta spread over the years 1809–11.

Nemnich continued to produce several more dictionaries including his Britische Waaren-Encyklopädie which also appeared in an English version as Encyclopaedia of merchandise: comprising all the exports and imports of Great-Britain, her colonies and America, both published by Nemnich himself in Hamburg in 1815. This was followed by a German-English/English-German dictionary of commercial correspondence, Universal-Lexicon der Englischen und Deutschen Handlungs-Correspondenz, which also appeared in both German and English versions and was published in 1816. In 1820 a new edition of his Waaren-Lexicon appeared, the Neues Waaren-Lexicon in zwölf Sprachen.

In 1819 Nemnich was appointed to a post in Hamburg as censor of literature intended for children and women and this seems to have brought an end to his prolific writing career. He is known to have produced only one further work which was a translation published in 1820 of Sir John Ross's Voyage of discovery ... in H.M.S. Isabella and Alexander, for the purpose of exploring Baffin's Bay and inquiring into the probability of a north-west passage (originally published, London, 1819). He died in Hamburg in 1822.

Nemnich was a compulsive observer and collector of facts but he lacked depth and originality and the ability to analyse his facts. His visits to Britain and other European countries reveal him in this light rather than as an industrial spy or as a political economist. He was obviously a natural linguist, a gift which he put to good use in his various polyglot dictionaries.

== Principal works ==
Allgemeines Polyglotten-Lexicon der Natur-Geschichte mit erklaerenden Anmerkungen. (Wörterbücher der Naturgeschichte in der deutschen, holländischen, dänischen, schwedischen, englischen, französischen, italienischen, spanischen und portugisischen Sprache) (Halle : Johann Jacob Gebauer (Lief. i); Hamburg : Nemnich (Lief. ii-viii),1793-8).

Beschreibung einer im Sommer 1799 von Hamburg nach u. durch England geschehenen Reise (Tübingen : Cotta, 1800).

Britische Waaren-Encyklopädie (Hamburg : 1815). English version published as Encyclopaedia of merchandise : comprising all the exports and imports of Great-Britain, her colonies and America (Hamburg : printed for P.A. Nemnich [and] sold by T. Boosey, London, by A. Constable, Edinburgh, 1815).

Comtoir-Lexicon, in neun Sprachen : für Handelsleute, Rechtsgelehrte und sonstige Geschäfftsmänner (Hamburg : beym Verfasser, 1803). English version published as Counting house lexicon in nine languages (Hamburg : edition prepared for sales in England by J. White, etc., London, 1803).

Entdeckungsreise unter den Befehlen der britischen Admiralität mit den königlichen Schiffen Isabella und Alexander um Baffins-Bay auszuforschen und die Möglichkeit einer nordwestlichen Durchfahrt zu untersuchen (Leipzig: Fleischer, 1820) [Translation of Voyage of discovery ... in H.M.S. Isabella and Alexander [in 1818], for the purpose of exploring Baffin's Bay and inquiring into the probability of a north-west passage by John Ross (London : 1819)].

Französische Waaren-Encyklopädie (Hamburg : in der Nemnischen Buchhandlung, 1815).

Lexicon nosologicum polyglotton omnium morborum, symptomatum vitiorumque naturae et affectionum propria nomina decem diversis linguis explicata continens (Hamburgi : C. Müller for the author, etc., 1801).

Neueste Reise durch England, Schottland, und Ireland, hauptsächlich in Bezug auf Produkte, Fabriken, und Handlung (Tübingen : Cotta, 1807).

Tagebuch einer der Kultur und Industrie gewidmeten Reise. Bd 1-8 (Tübingen : Cotta, 1809–11).

Universal-Lexicon der Englischen und Deutschen Handlungs-Correspondenz (Hamburg : Selbstverl., 1816). English version published as Commercial dictionary, English and German, German and English … (Hamburg : 1816).

Waaren-lexicon : in zwölf sprachen der Hamburgischen Commerz-Deputation zugeeignet (Hamburg : [gedruckt bey Conrad Müller], 1797–1802. English version published as Universal European dictionary of merchandise : in the English, German, Dutch, Danish, Swedish, French, Italian, Spanish, Portuguese, Russian, Polish & Latin languages (London : printed for J. Johnson, J. Remnant, & W. Remnant in Hamburgh, 1799 [i.e. 1798]). [New edition published 1820 as Neues Waaren-Lexicon in zwölf Sprachen (Hamburg : [Nemnichschen Buchhandlung], 1820.

Besides the above Nemnich produced a number of shorter works, often extracted from one or other of the works listed above.
