= Rural Khmer house =

Traditional house of the Khmer people

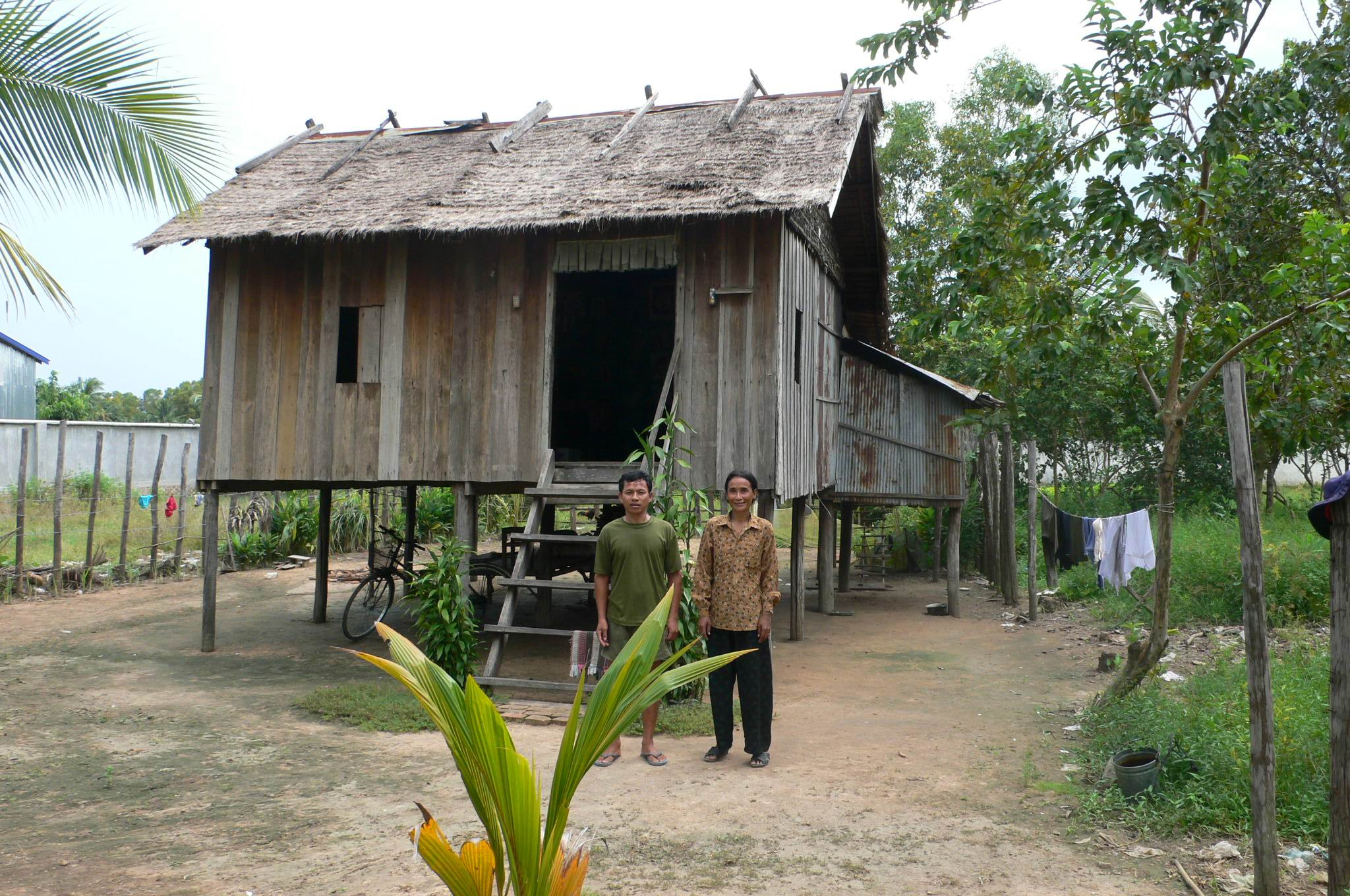
Rural Khmer house

Rural Khmer houses are a traditional house type of the Khmer people in Cambodia.

Typically, rural Khmer two-story buildings vary in size from 4 metres (13 ft) by 6 metres (20 ft) to about 6 by 10 metres (33 ft). The basic structure features a wooden frame and a roof erected before the walls on the upper floor are inserted. The roof frame defines the type of the house: a gabled roof (Phteah Rông Daol), a hipped roof (Phteah Pét), the Khmer house (Phteah Keung) with a roof shape sometimes called a bonnet roof, or shikoro in Japanese. In Battambang province, most houses have open spaces beneath the roof. They are called Phteah Rông Doeung, which may be derived from thbal kdoeung, meaning that a rice mill was stored at the back of the house under a second awning. A common feature in every type of house is a 5–10 cm gap on all four sides, between the top of the wall of the upper floor, and the roof.

Dwellings are raised on stilts that sometimes extend as high as 3 metres (9.8 ft) off the ground. Thus, annual floods do not affect the main room in the houses of rice farmers, whereas rural farmers are able to use the ground level area beneath the house for working and to provide shelter for livestock. One or two wooden ladders, ramps, or staircases provide access to the upper floor. The simplest houses consist of only one room on the upper floor, partitioned off to provide a storage place for rice, a bedroom for the parents, and a further space for unmarried daughters.

The upper floor generally consists of one large room. The main part of this room, the area where visitors are received, is defined by four central pillars; in this space there will be a figure of Buddha, a television, and a battery-operated electric light in the centre attached to the pillars. The parents' sleeping space is situated either to the left or the right of the central entrance; textiles are often hung to separate this area from the rest of the room. To the back of the upper floor, on the left, is a space for the girls, whilst the boys have a space reserved for them on the right. This arrangement may vary from one family to another, but children are always separated by gender and placed at the back of the house. Other variations in position relative to the main central area are possible, but this room, with a figure of Buddha, television and battery-operated light, always remains the most important area.

Despite indoor and outdoor temperatures of 36 °C (97 °F) and up to 80% relative humidity, the old rural Khmer houses are very comfortable, both at ground level and on the upper floor. In spite of the absence of electric or mechanical air conditioning, a draught-free environment appears to be attained simply by means of natural ventilation.

== Khmer house ==
The original Khmer house is a stilt house, or pile, house. The structure consists of evenly spaced wooden pilings that extend from the ground to the eaves or the roof ridge historically called ridge-post framing. No provision is made at ground level for any form of wall cladding or protection against wind and rain; by day this area provides shade and serves as a living space for the inhabitants and their livestock. The upper floor, which is closed on all four sides, provides sleeping accommodation during the night; clothes, furniture and objects of value are stored here. A gable roof with an open truss completes the structure. This is now what most common houses look like.

Depending on social status or financial possibilities, this basic structure may vary. Such variations can often be seen in the partitioning of the upper floor: the division between the parents' room, or the area set aside for the children, may be extended to include a large veranda, thus providing a separation from the private part of the house. According to the size of the building, further variations may be found: to avoid too great a span width, and economise on material, larger buildings no longer have a simple pitched roof.

Based on the framework and depending on the size of the building, 1 – 3 pitched roofs are placed alongside each other; the central roof will be noticeably smaller and narrower. A hip roof is another variation of the typical roof of a Khmer house; this construction requires a large amount of material and is complicated, so it is rarely seen. The shape of the roof defines the different house types. The Khmer house is an example of indigenous materials used with a traditional design called vernacular architecture.

=== The rural Khmer house: a functional dwelling ===
The rural Khmer house is a perfect example of a dwelling whose simple structure serves its main functions. As well as providing a living and working area, the building serves as a shelter, which is of vital importance in the everyday life of a home in a rural setting that is exposed to the elements. During the day, the house functions as a large umbrella. Work and life go on at ground level, where the most effective shade is provided. This area is used for eating and resting, as well as craftwork and various other tasks such as the repair of farm equipment.

As the space below the building is dry and easily accessible, some less-used areas at its outer limits are used for storage; for example, people may collect and store wood here until they are able to build the next house for their relatives. People do not stay upstairs during the day; they only sleep here at night. A separate room beside the main living space, which is often a step lower than the upper floor, is reserved for cooking.

=== Spatial organisation of the house ===
Typically, the kitchen is situated at the back of the house, often some steps lower and attached to the main building; it is not uncommon for there to be two entrances to this room, one from the upper floor and one directly from the ground level. Sometimes the kitchen is in a separate building near the house.

Much attention is paid to certain details, especially in a new house: the main beam of the roof and the main pillars are partially wrapped with glittering metal bands that invite good spirits to protect the house.

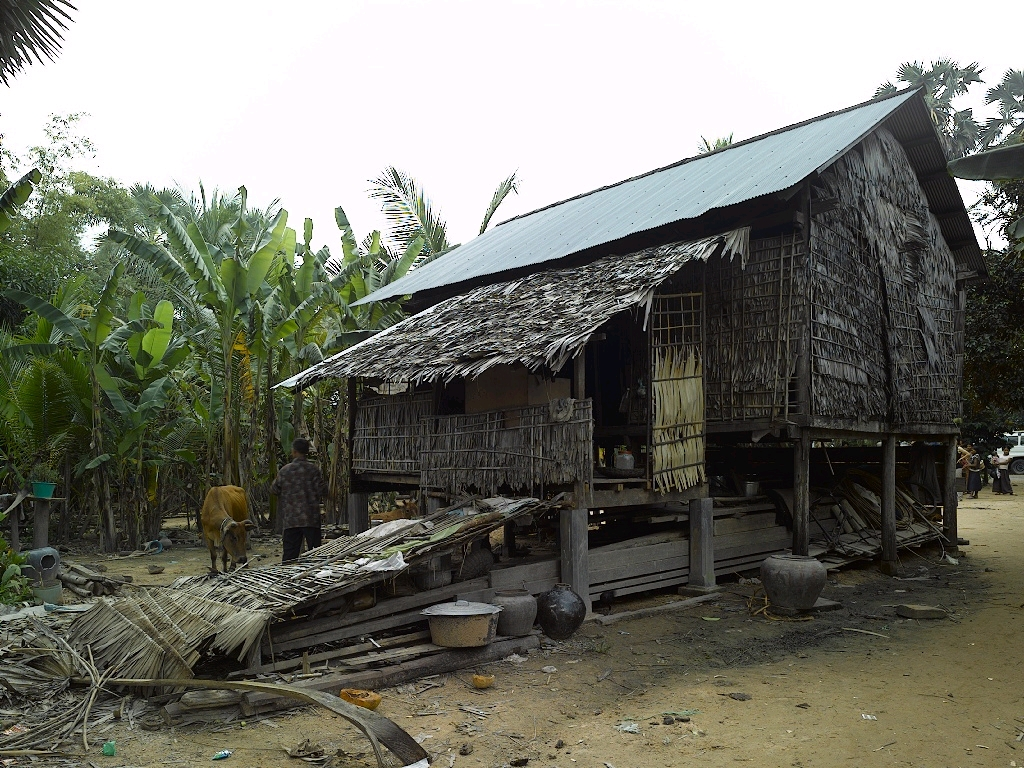

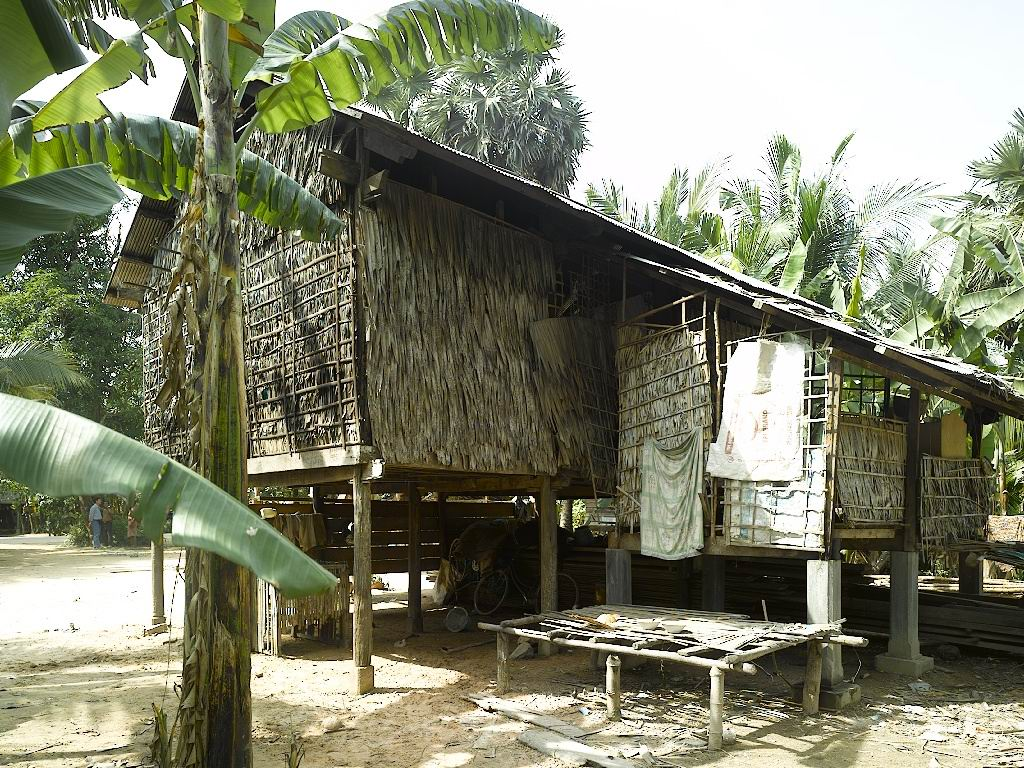

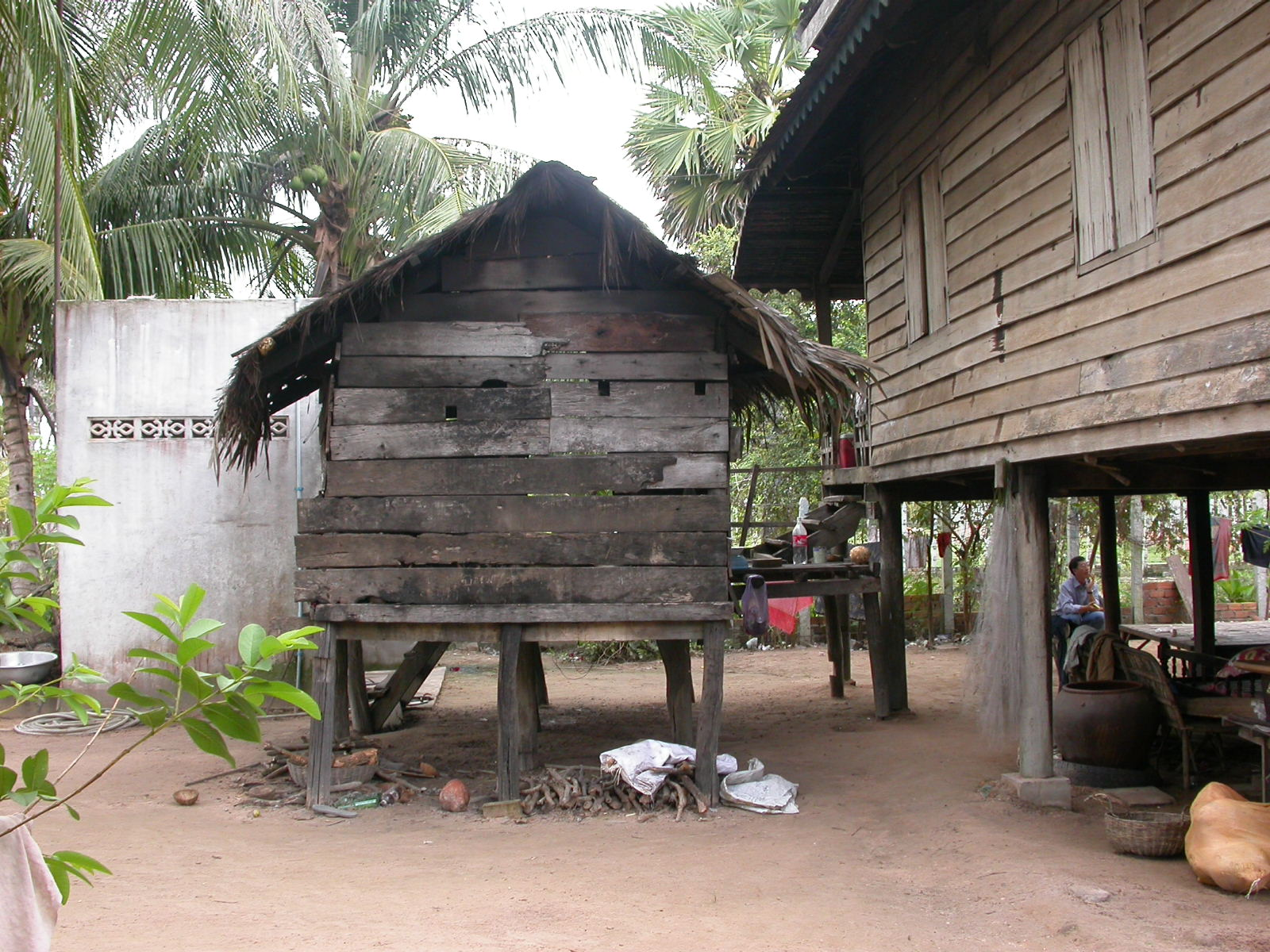

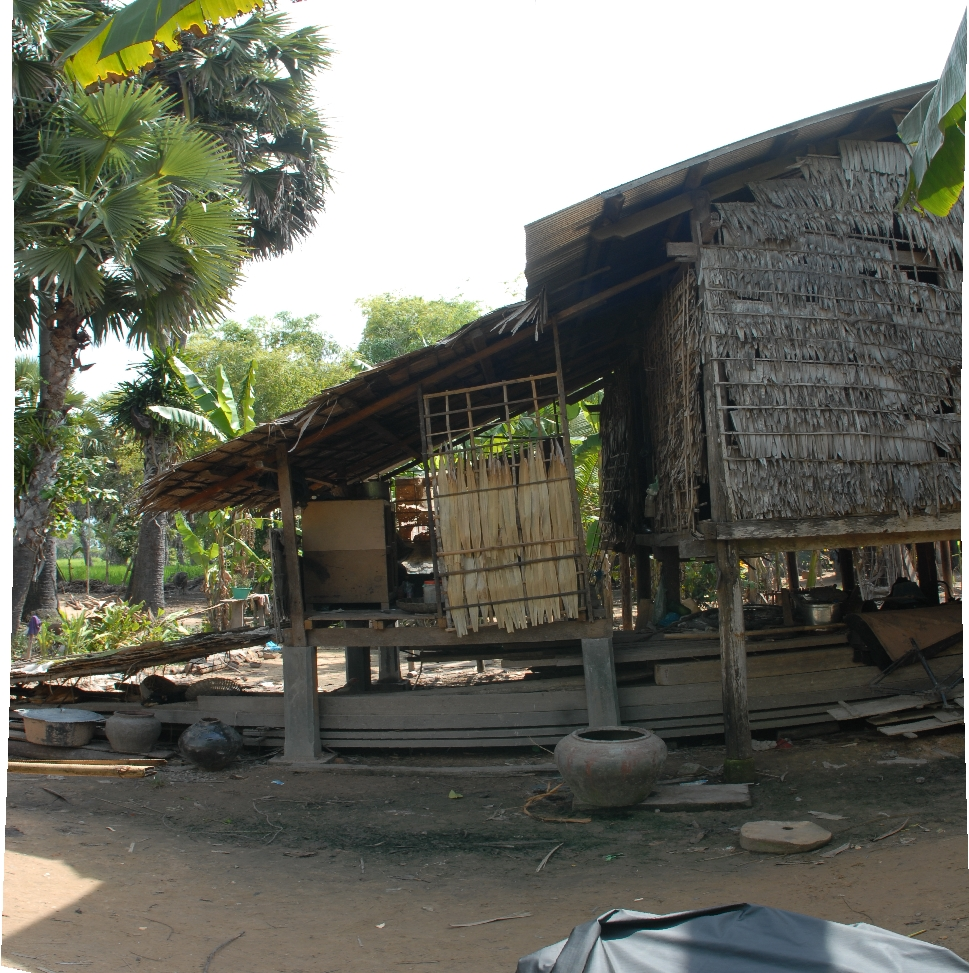

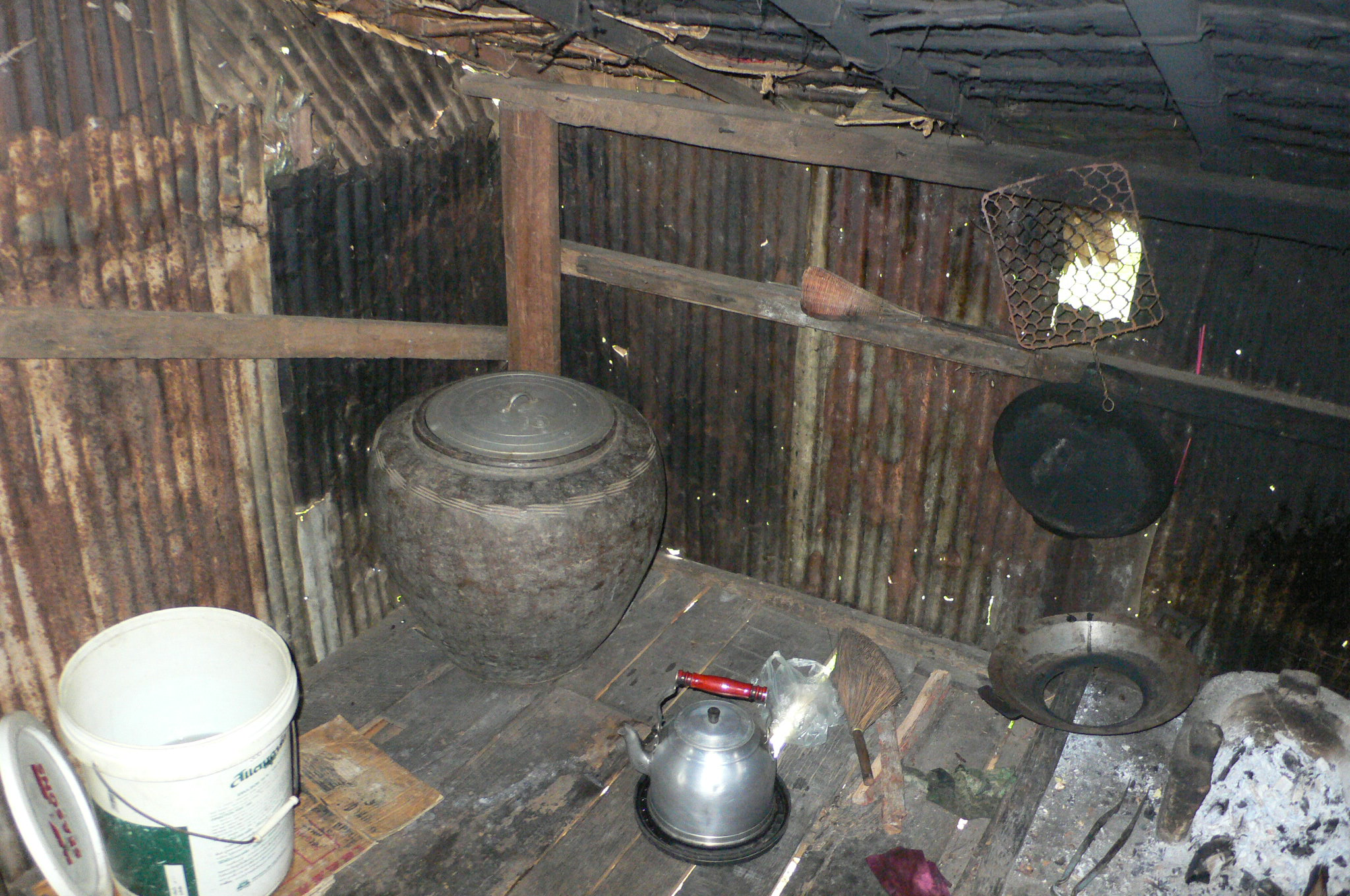

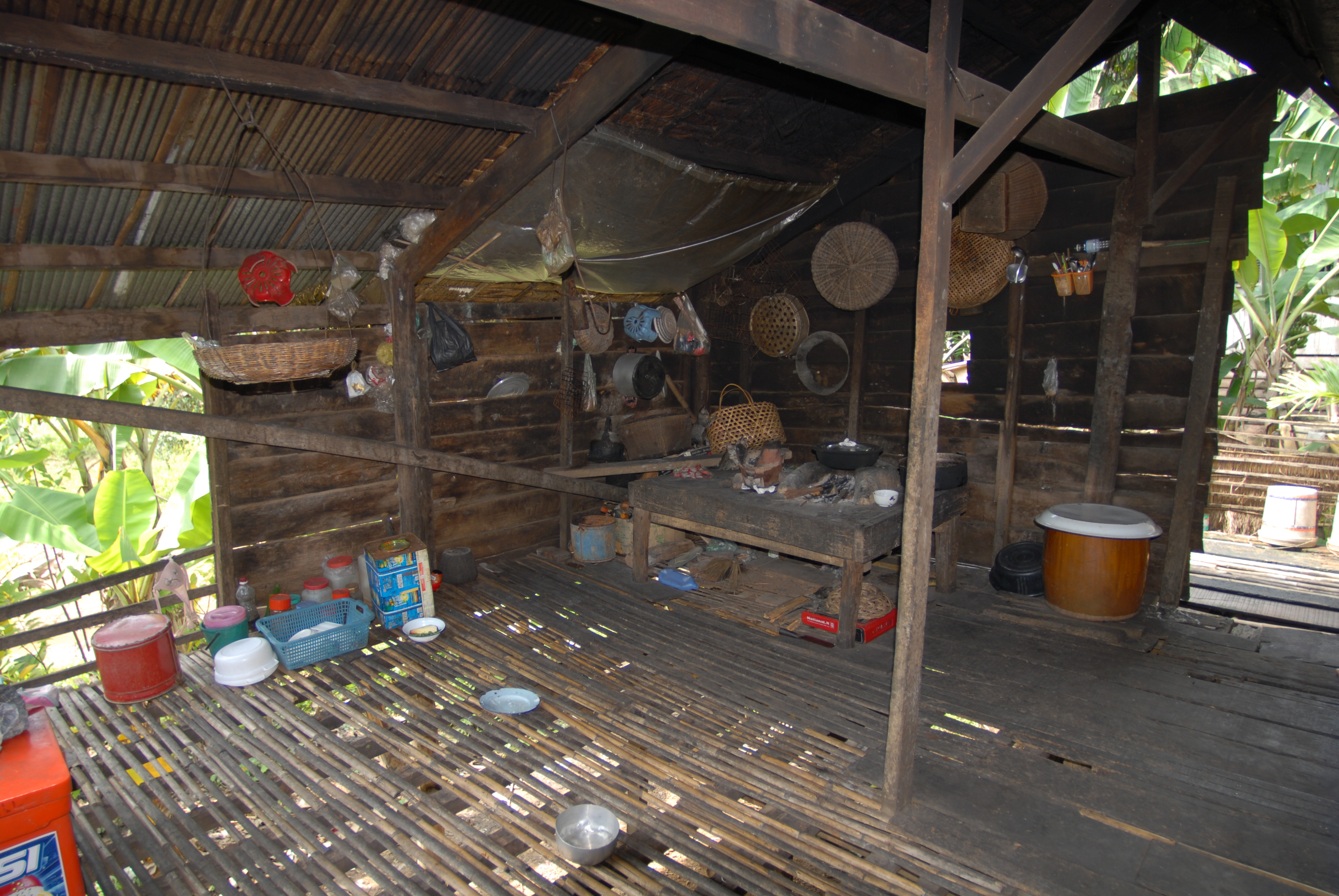

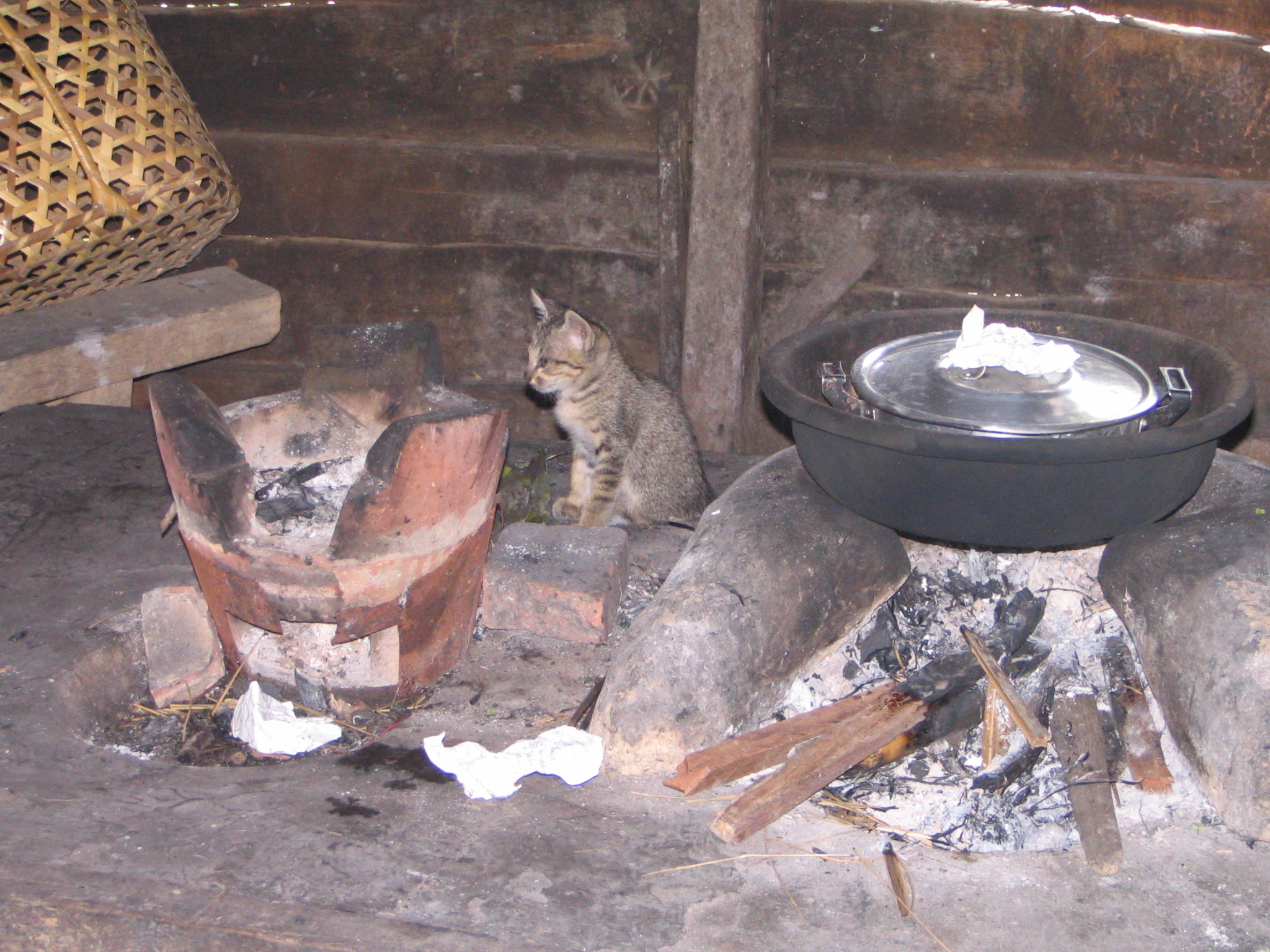

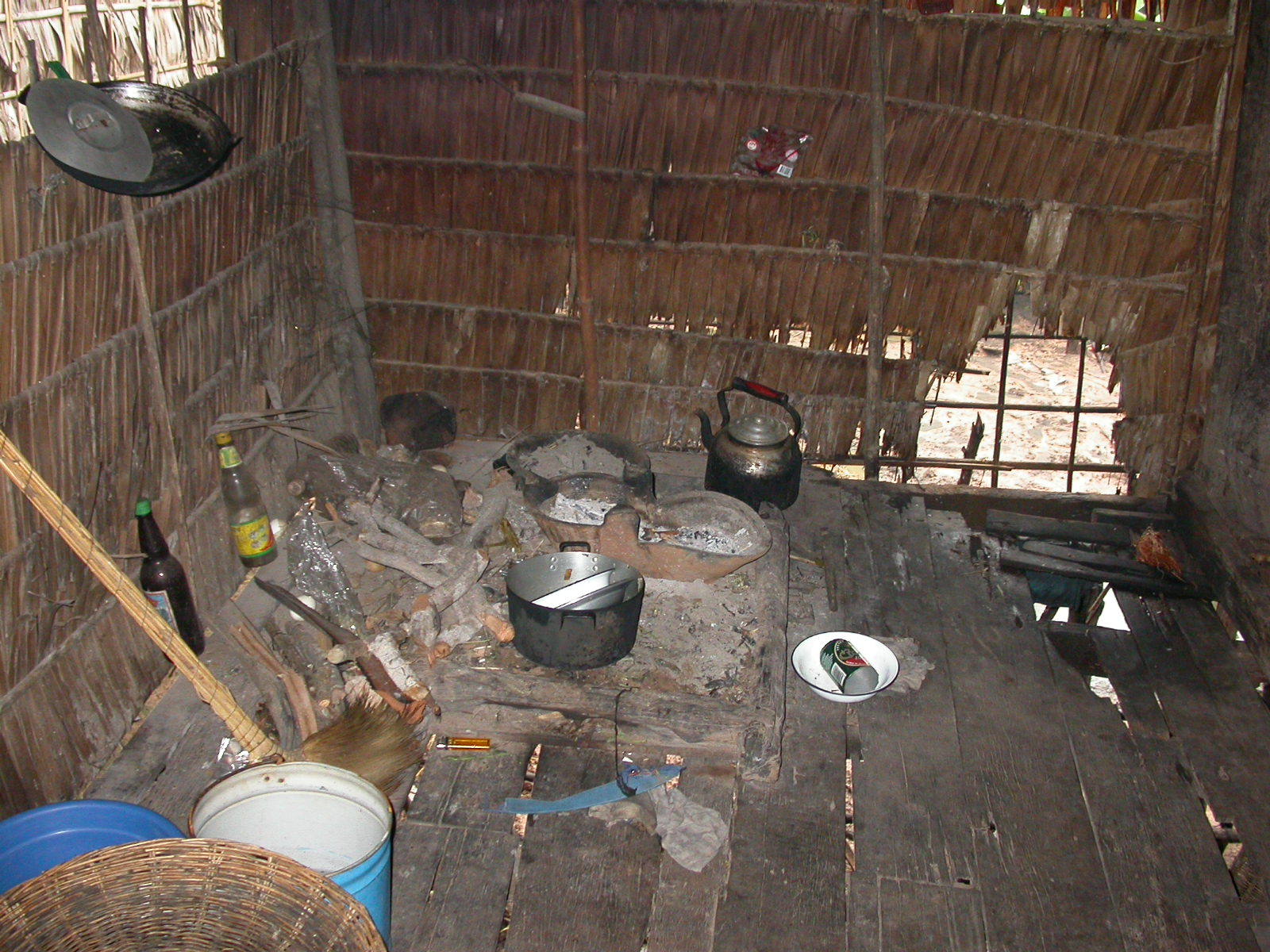

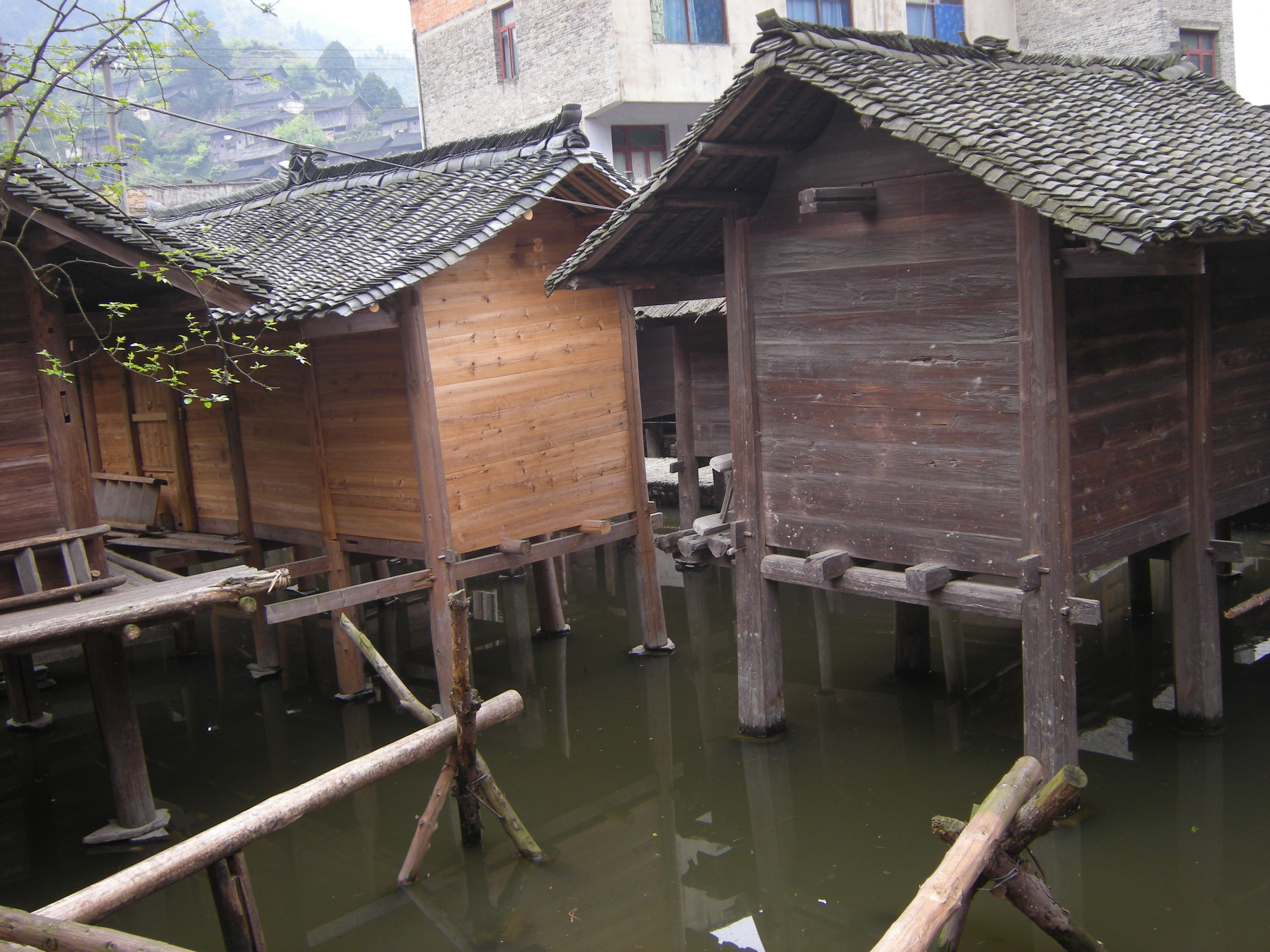

=== Traditional rural Khmer house ===
The typical rural house is the basic structure from which all variations have developed. Construction elements are made of wood; rounded posts are used for piles, whilst joists are made of squared beams. Simple carpentry is used to join horizontal and vertical elements; the use of screws, which would increase expense, is avoided. Panels of homemade palm matting cover the sides of the house; fixed to the wooden structure in a simple fashion they merely provide protection against the elements but have no influence on the stability of the construction. Palm matting is also used for roofing.

=== Traditional house in a settlement ===
The house pictured here is situated in a settlement. Typical characteristics of such a settlement are: the private sphere of each household is restricted to the area occupied by their dwelling; delimited by the stilt structure of the house, it is at ground level that daily life – work, eating, and family interaction – takes place. Livestock is kept here, in simple pens. These typical wooden buildings surround an open space (approximately 150 m2), where there is a communal source of water, which forms the centre of the settlement.

The image on the right shows a 107-year-old house and is still owned by the same family. It has a wooden structure, with bamboo walls. The roof is thatched with rice straw. The lifespan of such houses is obviously not very long, probably not more than 100 – 120 years.

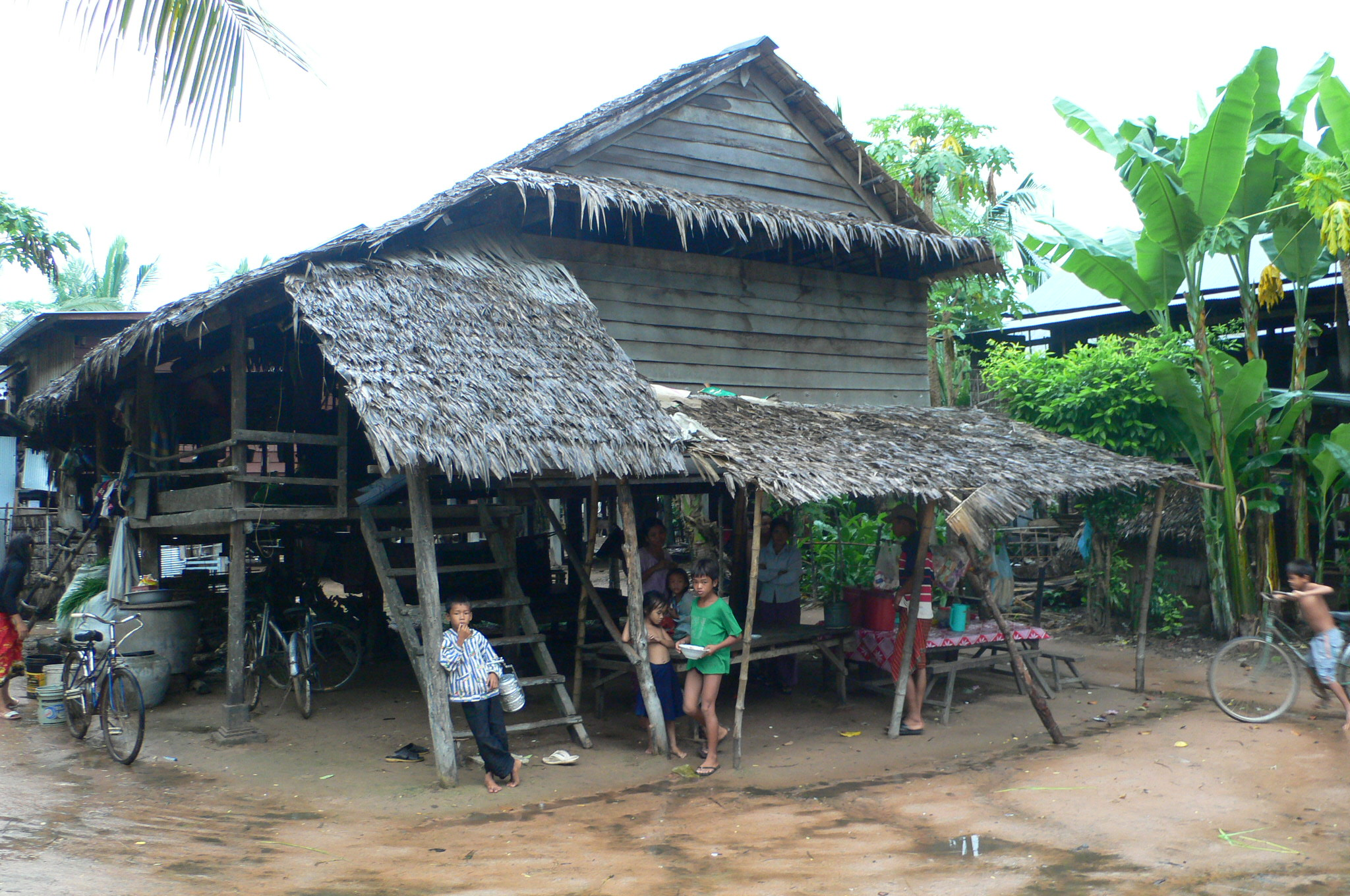

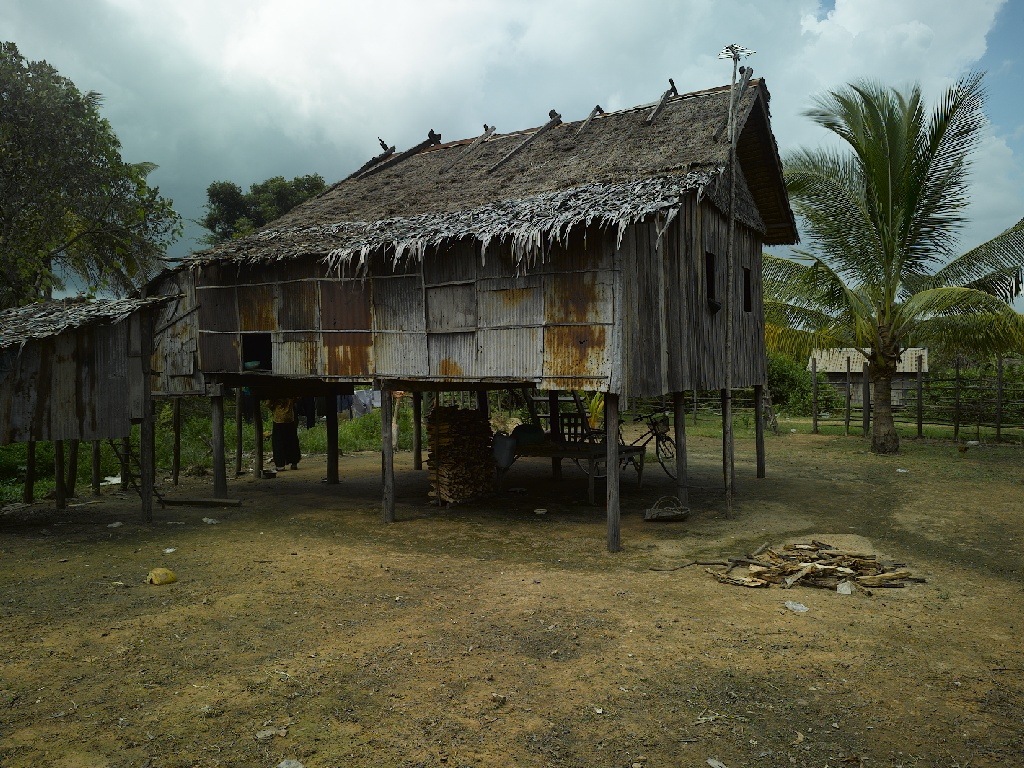

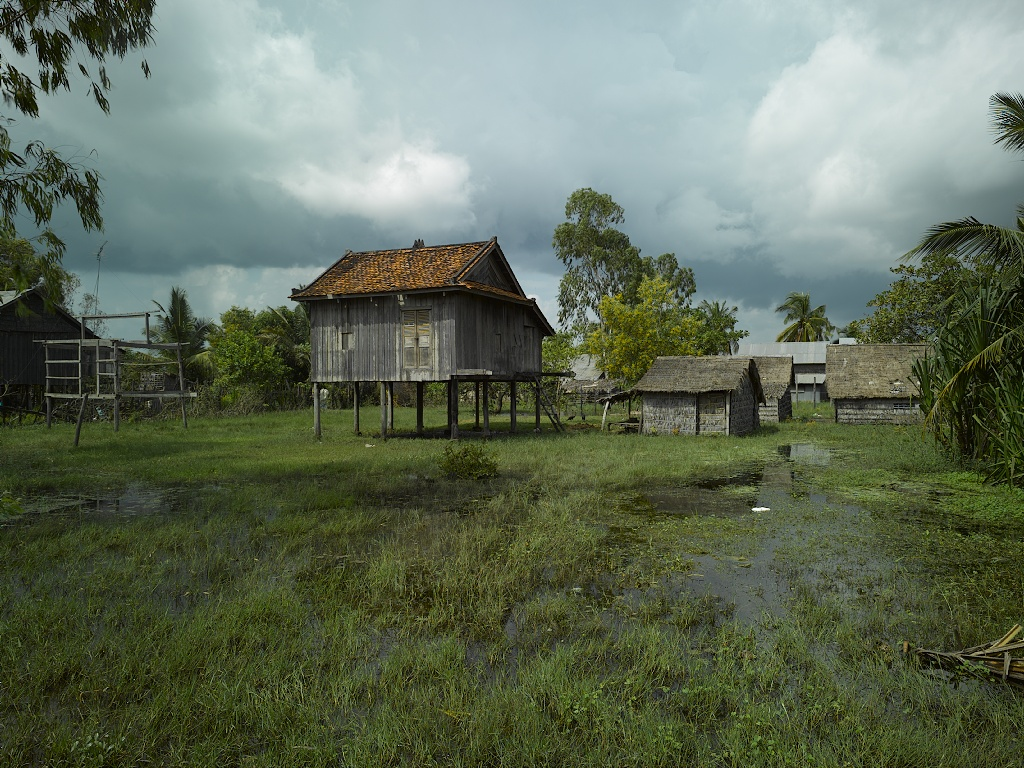

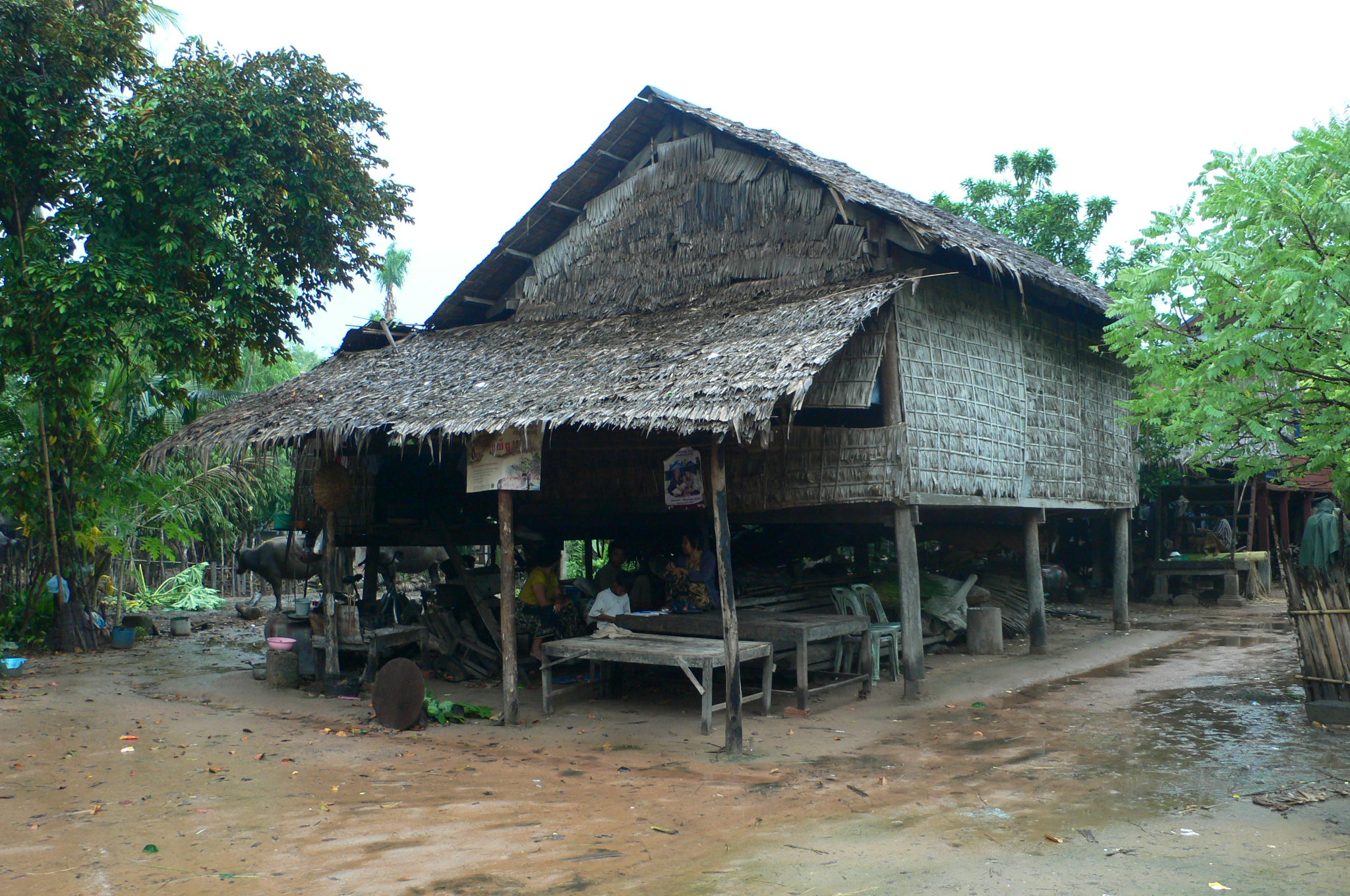

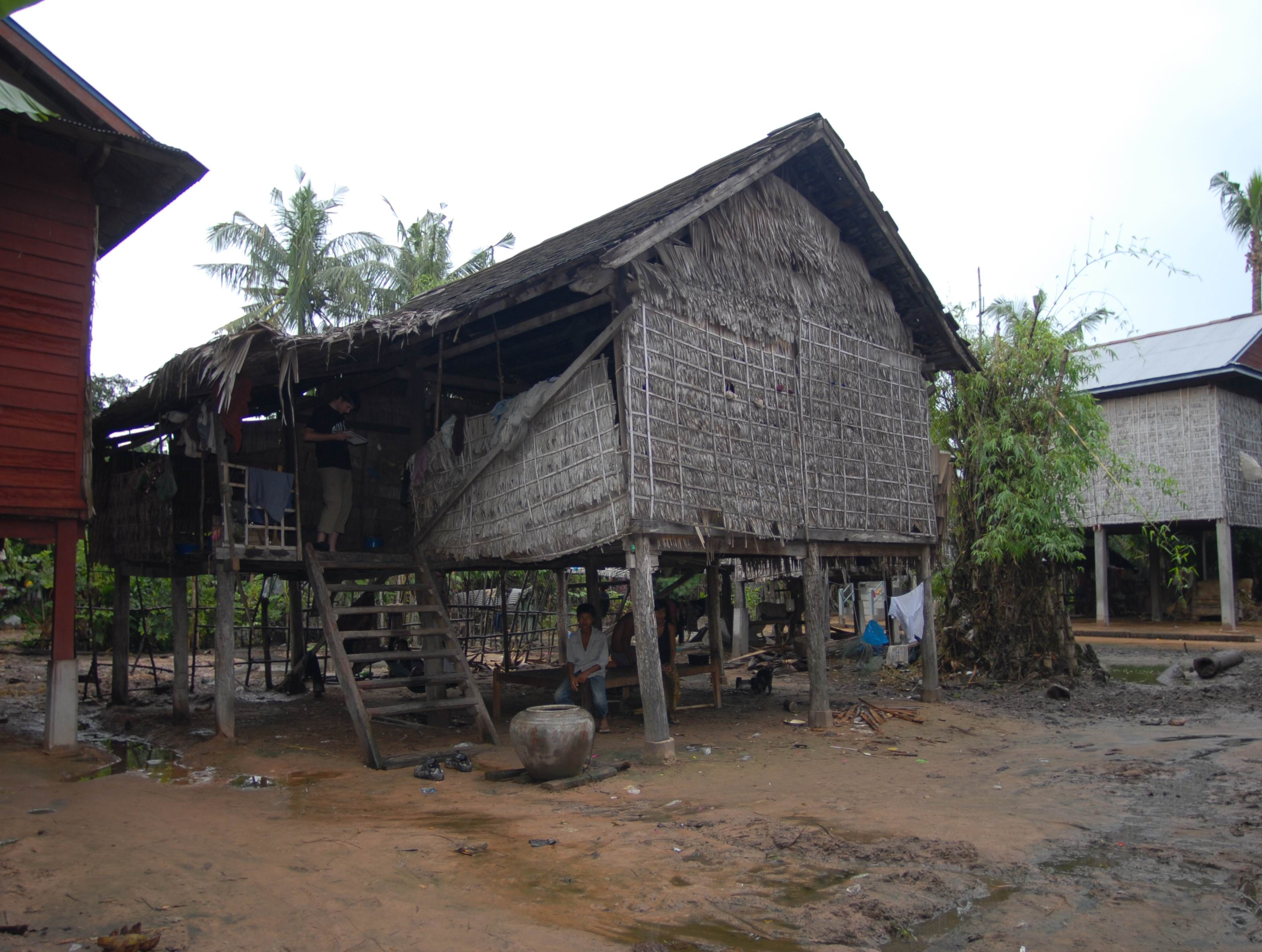
This house is 107 years old

=== Traditional waterside Khmer house ===
These houses stand in water, either temporarily or permanently, and are genuine pile buildings, with no foundations. Wooden diagonal struts that strengthen the piles standing in the water ensure the stability of the building.

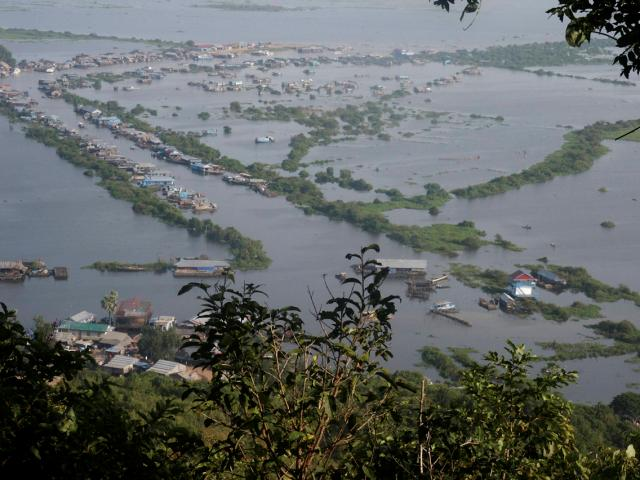

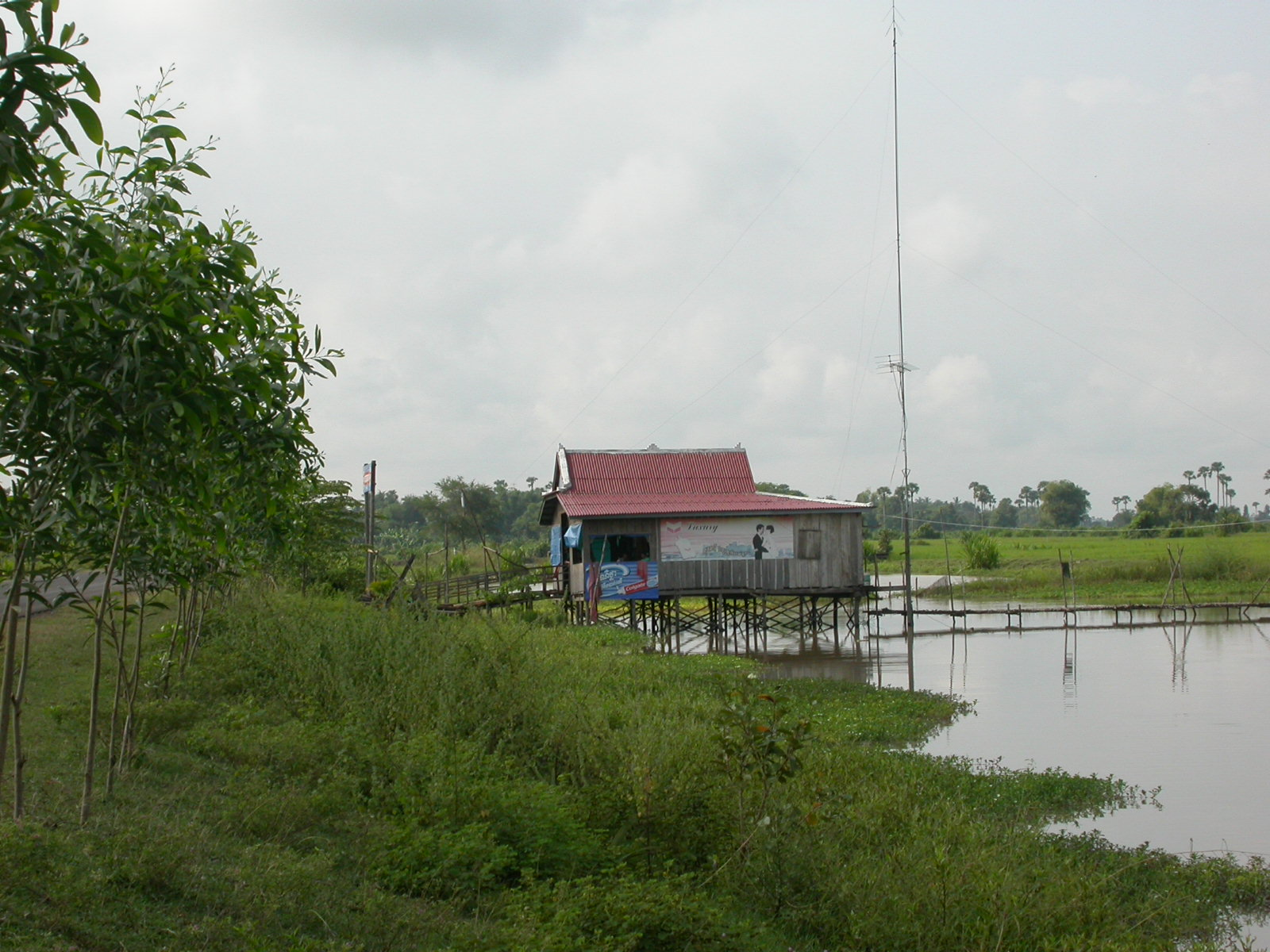

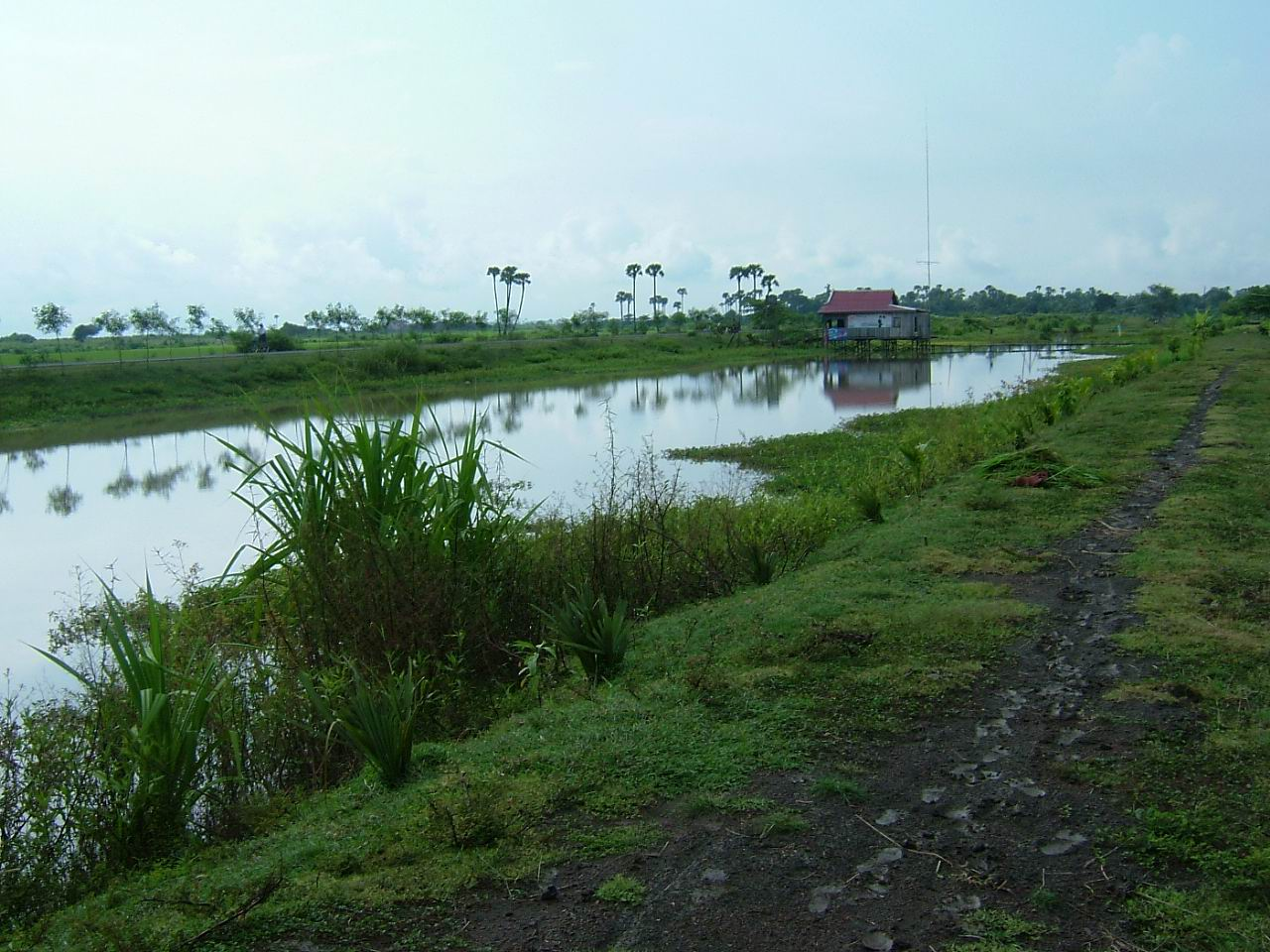

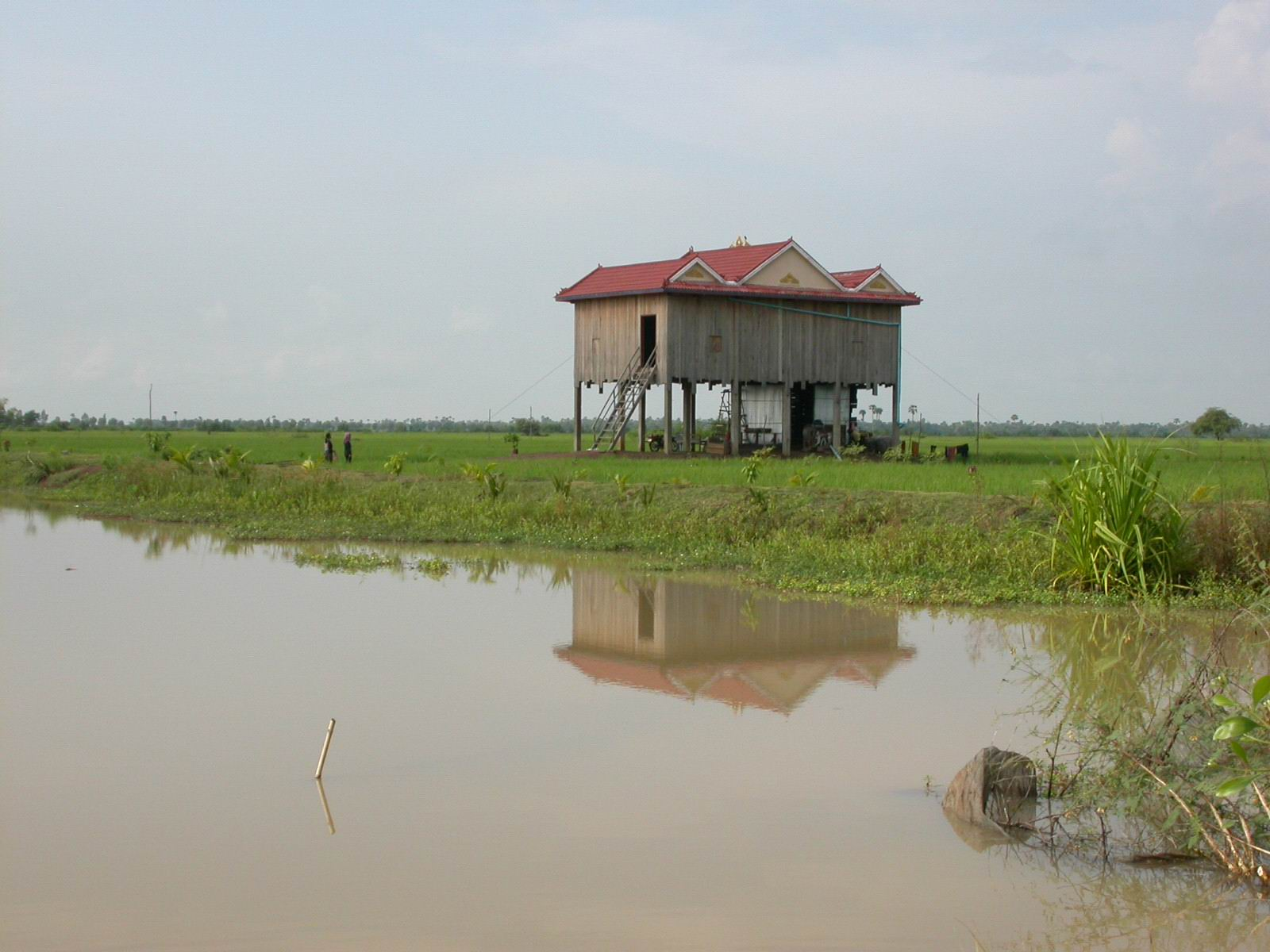

=== Further developments using modern building materials ===
Modern rural houses differ from simple rural houses above all in the wall cladding and roof covering. Wood is still used for the main structure, the only difference being that the piles stand on individual prefabricated concrete foundations. Instead of the original homemade palm matting, wooden boarding is used for wall cladding. Windows and doors remain as structural openings, but sometimes they are equipped with shutters.

Clay tiles or corrugated tin roofing replace the conventional roof covering that simply provided protection against the sun. Tiles are not homemade and have to be purchased. The use of modern building materials and the consequent alteration in the basic structure of the building increases the need for ventilation.

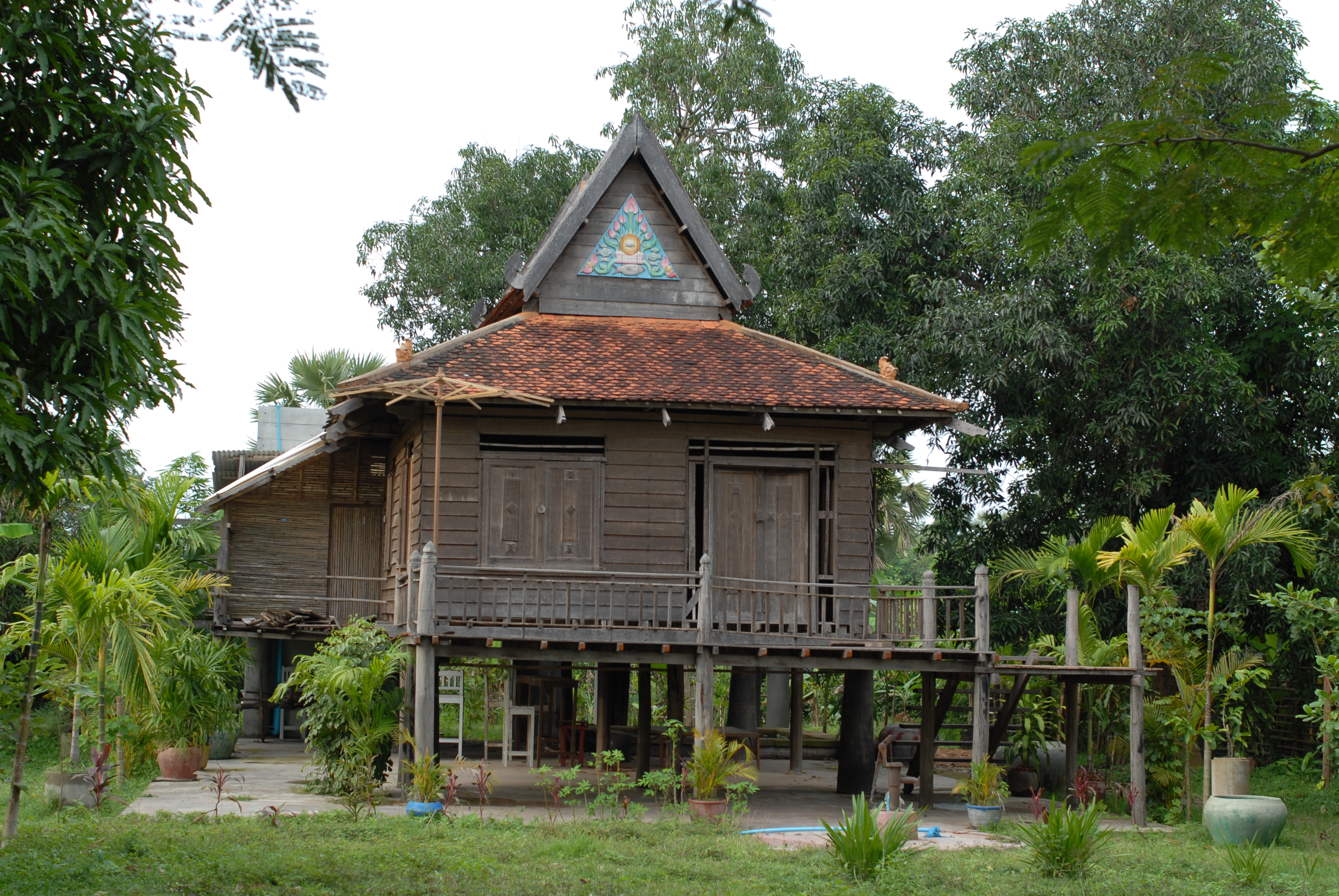

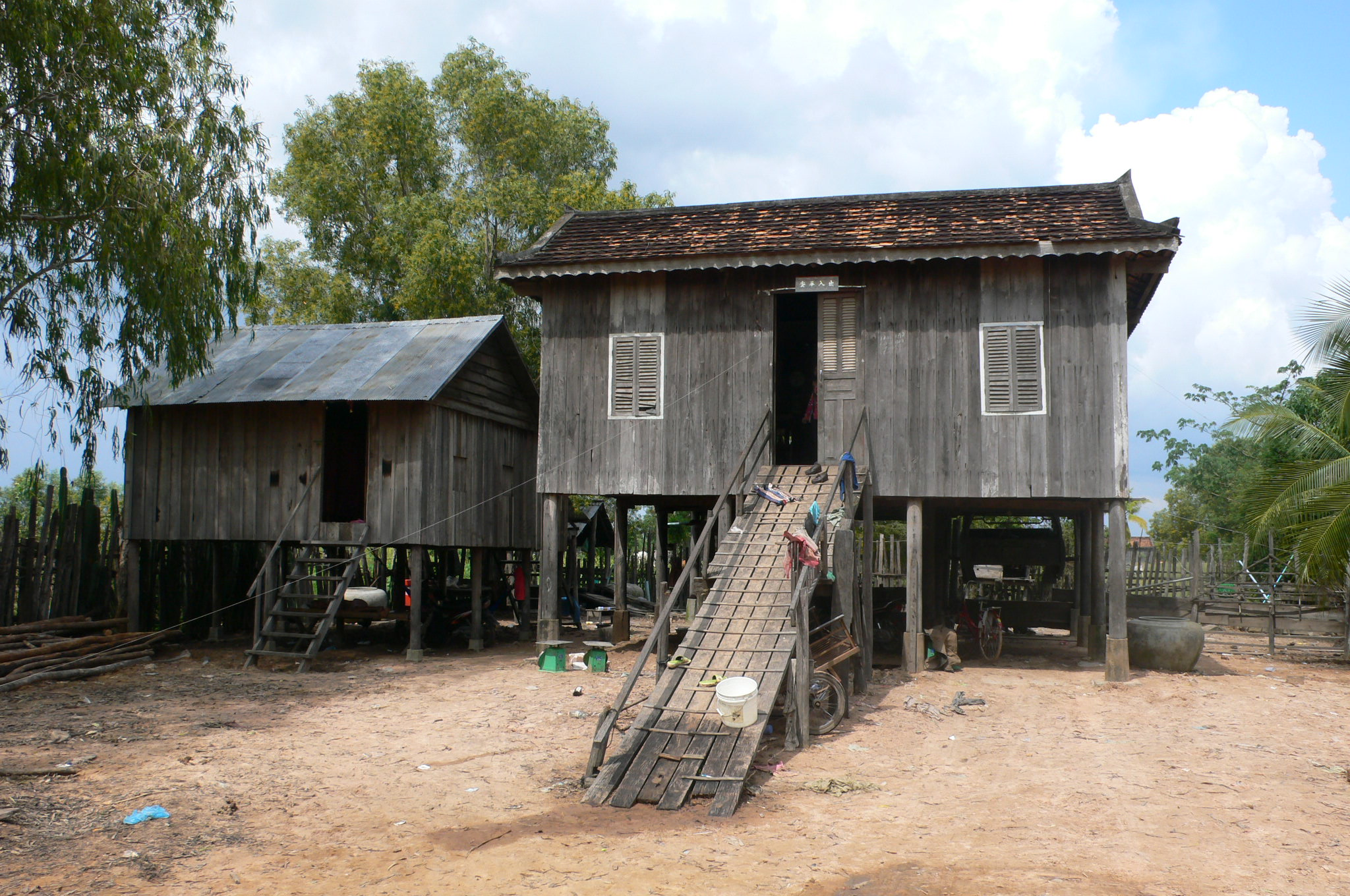

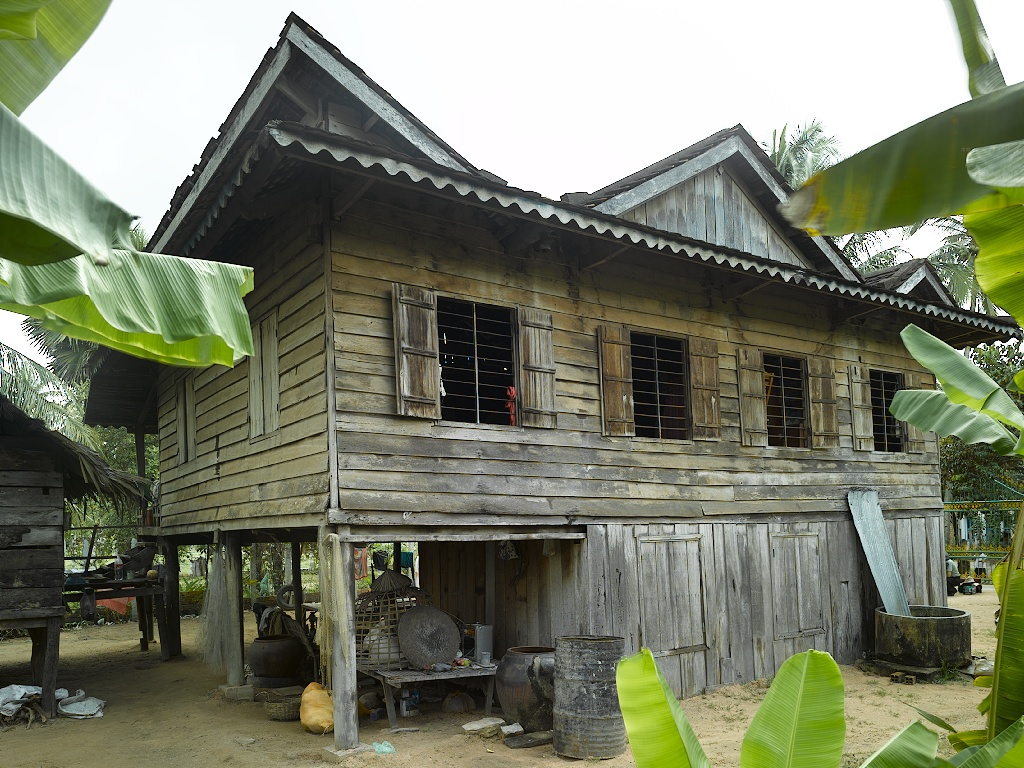

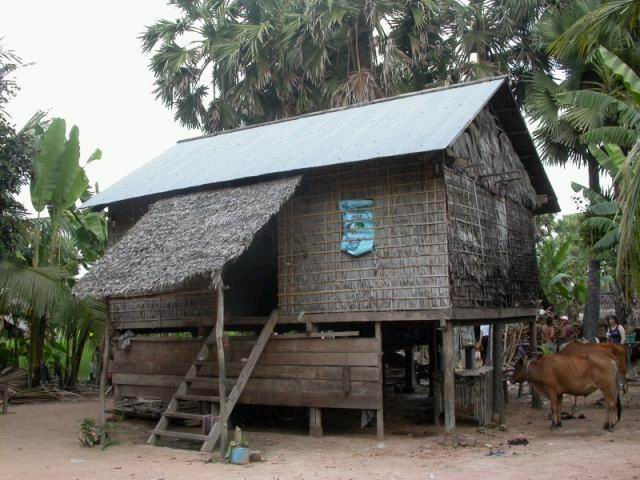

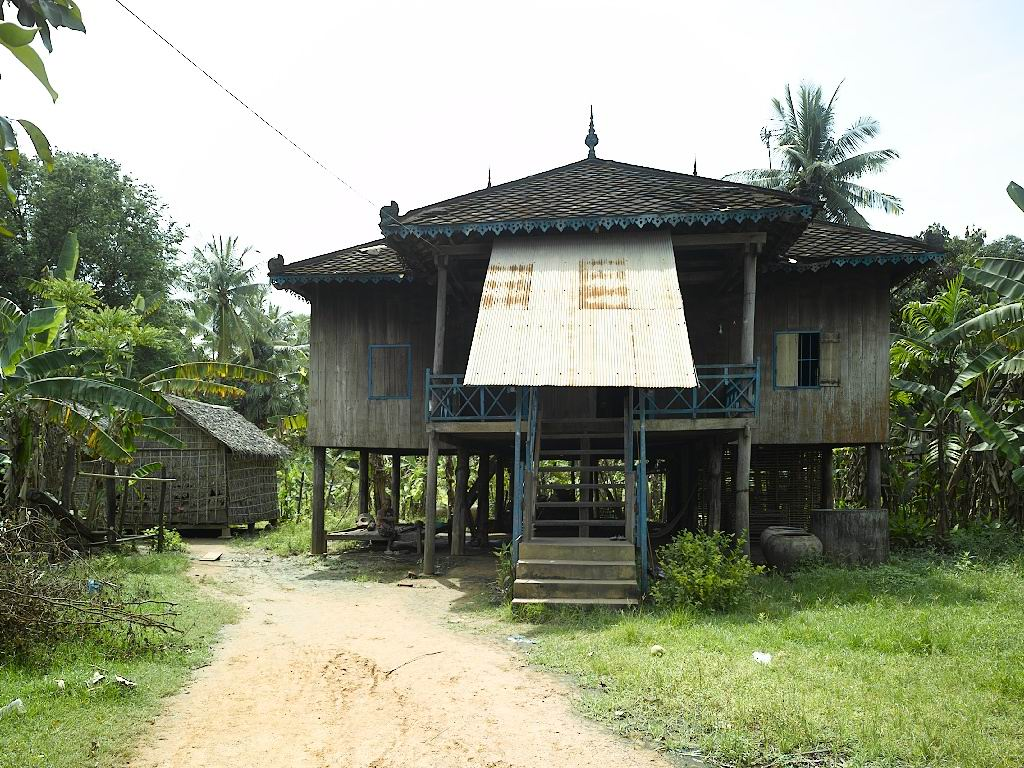

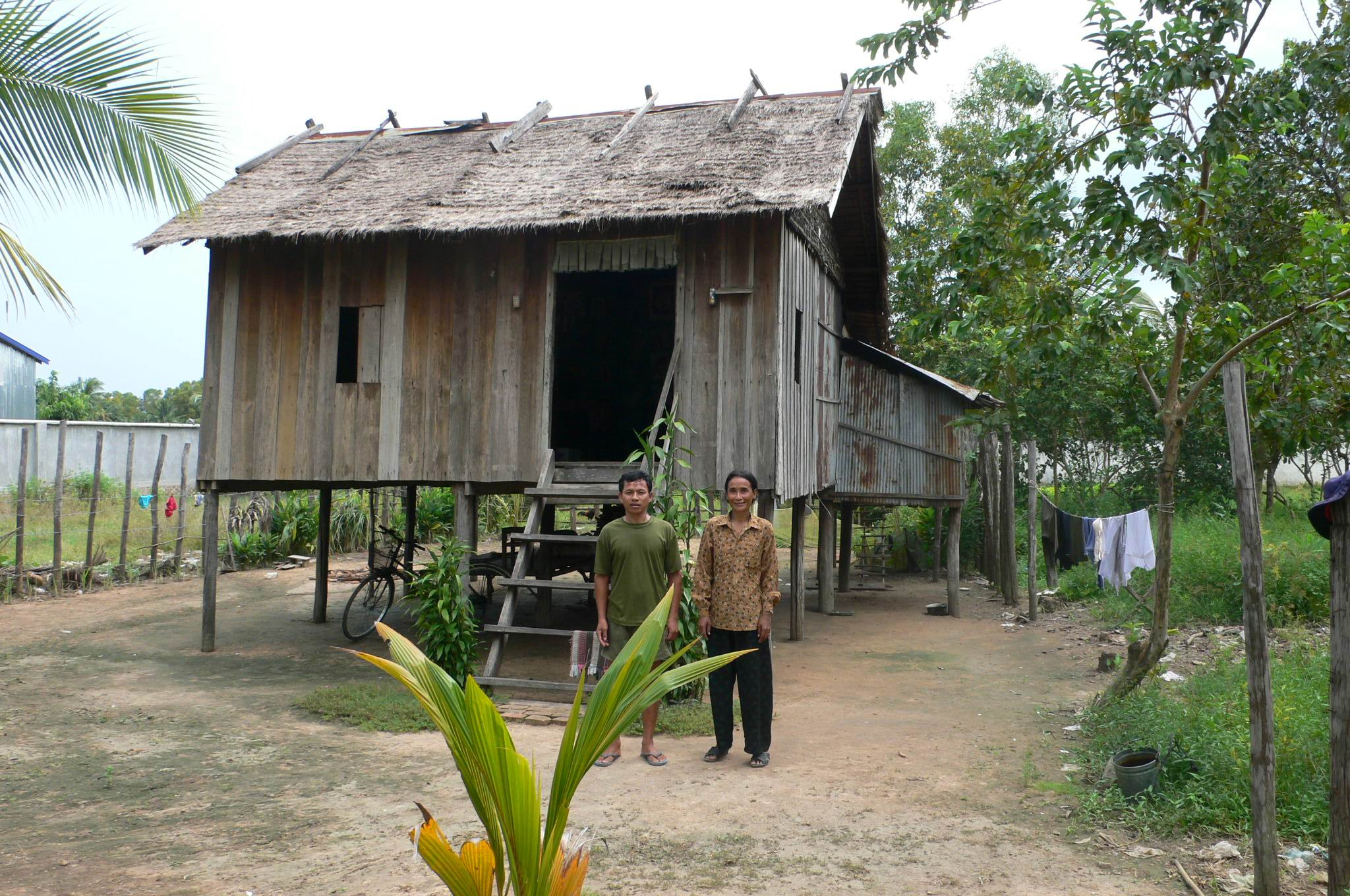

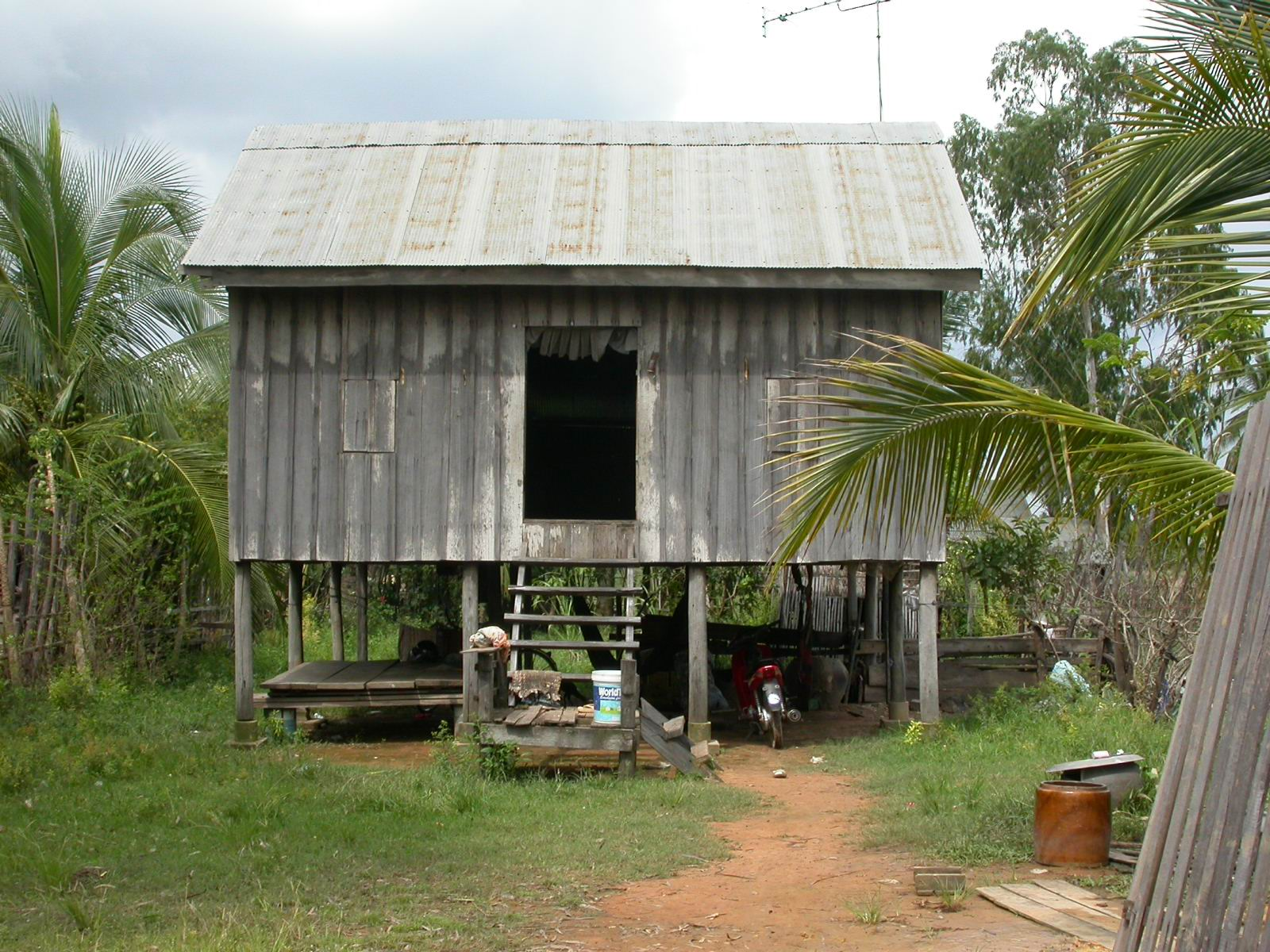

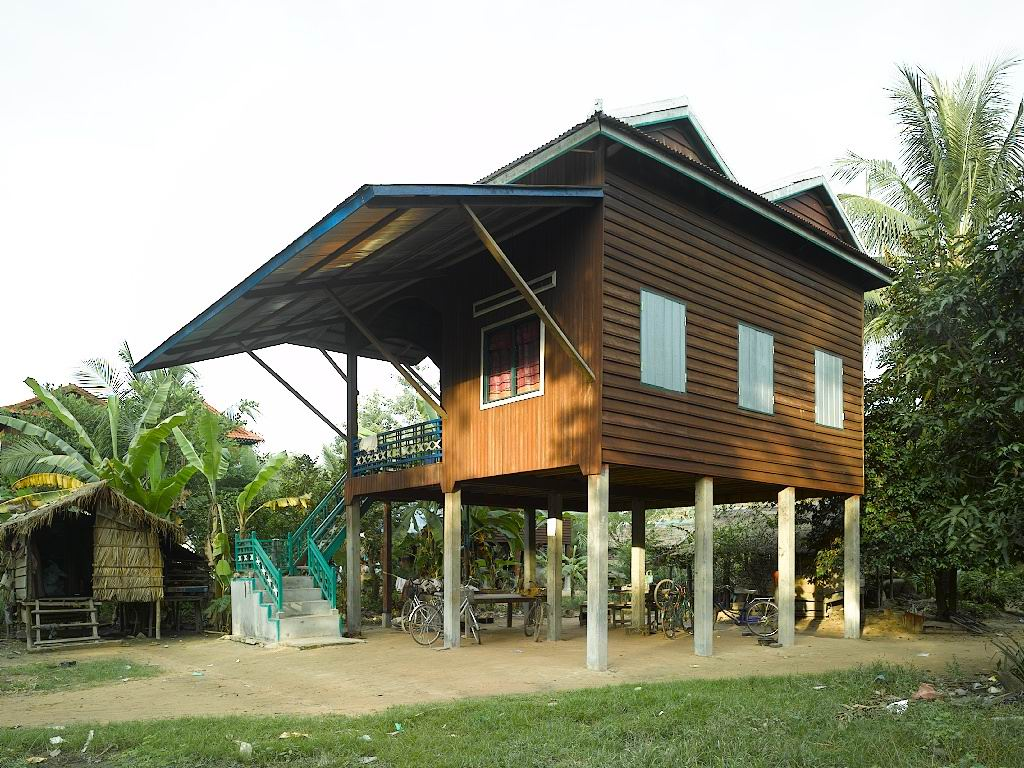

=== Walled rural house ===
In contemporary houses, the ground level, which was previously an open area simply defined by the open framework of the building, is now walled in. The walls are made of brick and are rendered on the outside and inside. The interior is now no longer an open space but divided into separate rooms by dividing walls. The window and door openings, so important for efficient natural ventilation, are now closed with wood-framed glass windows and a solid wooden front door.

The upper floor is still made of wood and built in the same way as the traditional wooden houses. However, the walled construction of the ground level means that the load no longer has to be conveyed to the individual points of the supporting structure, but can now be distributed at random. Consequently, we now find constructions that differ radically from the typical traditional basic design.

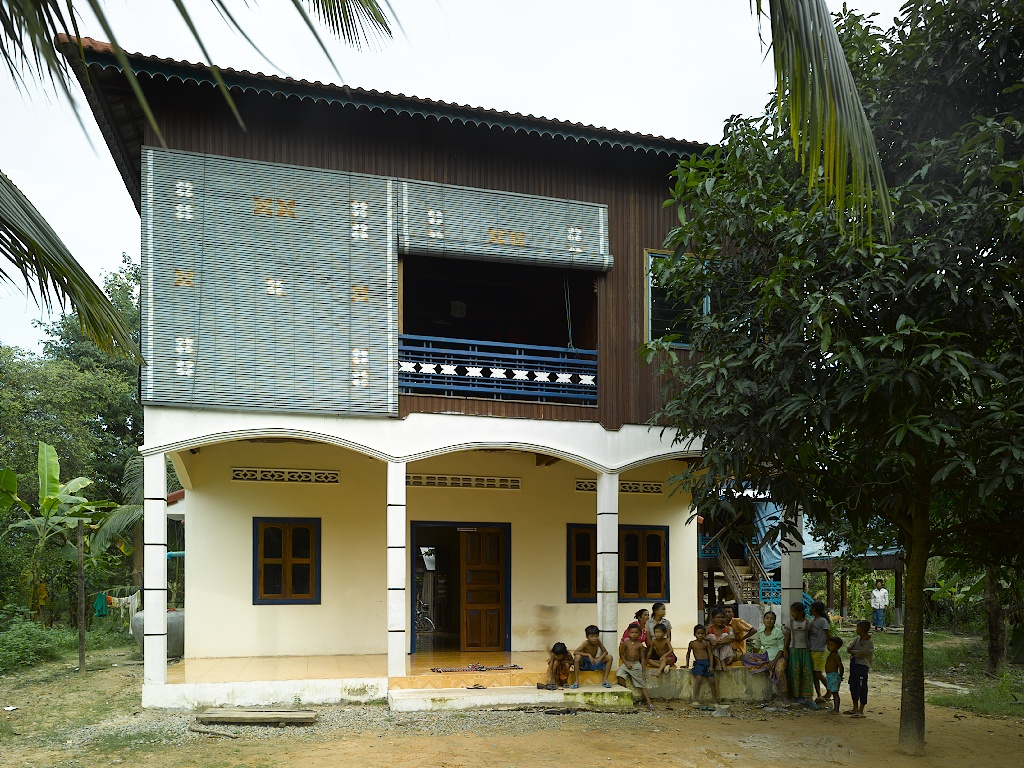

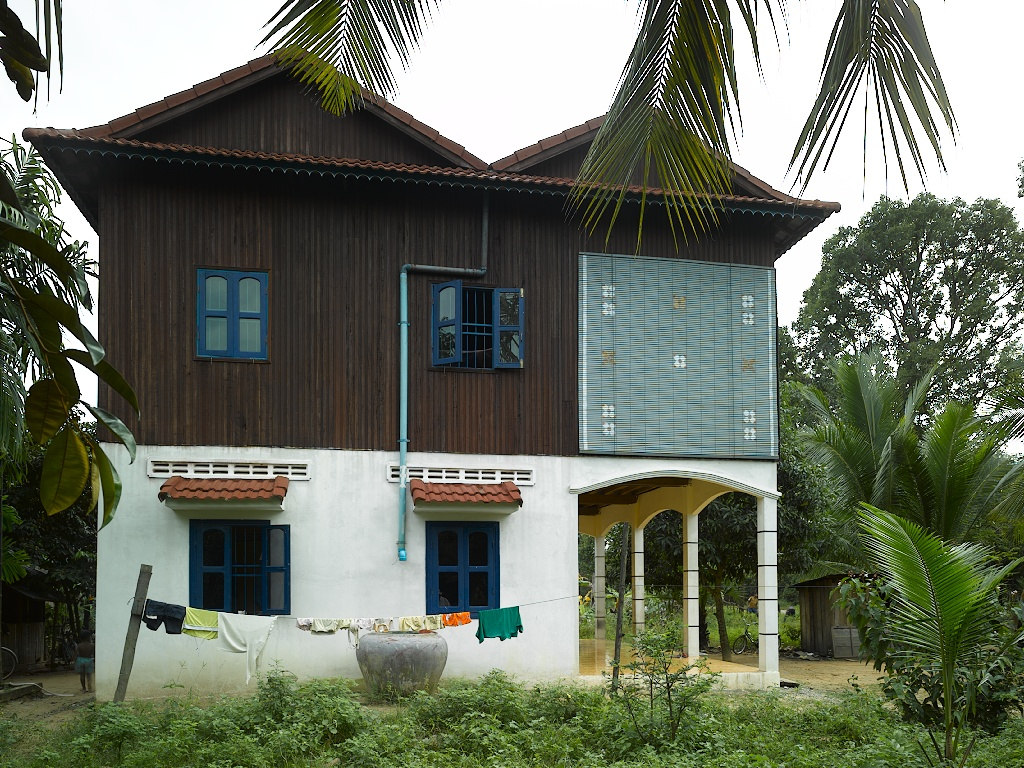

=== Masonry Versus Carpentry ===
Colonial architecture introduced the idea of solid, durable buildings that could be bought, sold and inherited. This was a radical cultural change. Such buildings were "grounded" by a system of walls requiring foundations rather than the traditional post and beam structure made of wood and raised off the ground. The Southeast Asian tradition of carpentry uses ingenious structures that are stable with a minimum of material. Carpentry for construction derives from three-dimensional thinking from boat building, basket weaving and even kite building.

While the traditional wooden house was built on stilts with matting used to enclose the raised living area, the colonial house had thick walls in which window openings could be cut out. With colonial architecture, the wall and the mason are predominant. With traditional architecture, wooden post and beam and the carpenter come into their own. This section "Masonry Versus Carpentry" is an excerpt from the book Building Cambodia: New Khmer Architecture 1953–1970.

== Access ==
Access to the upper floor is a special feature of Khmer houses and very varied. The simplest form may be a wooden ramp or ladder, whilst staircases can be of wooden filigree, spiral, or partially built in masonry. Whereas this means of access would formerly have been handmade, nowadays prefabricated concrete elements are widely used.

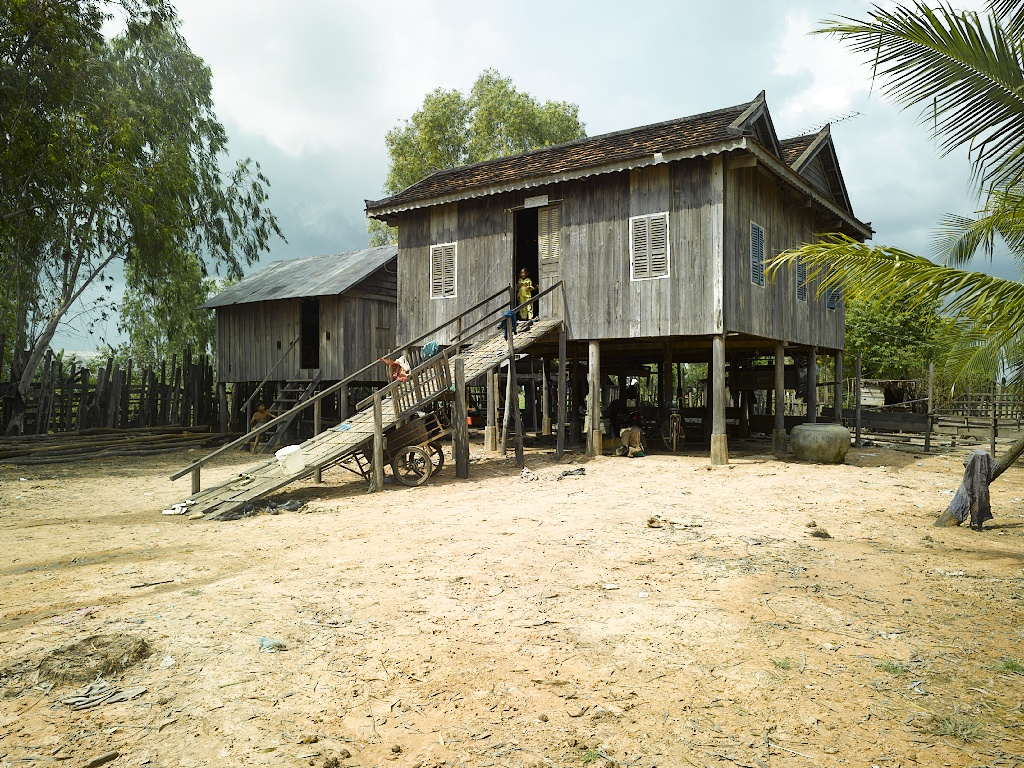

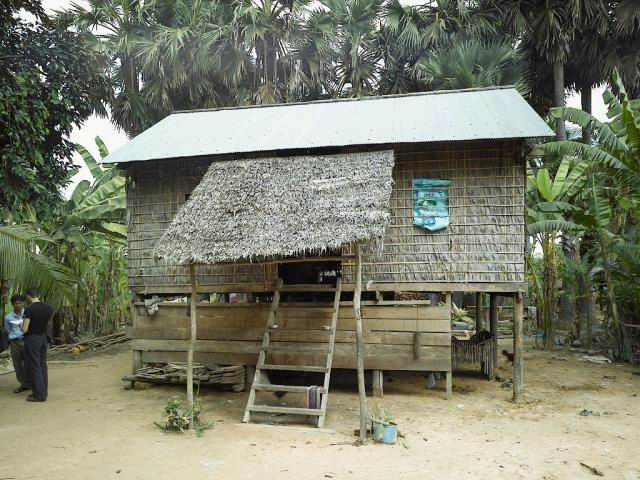

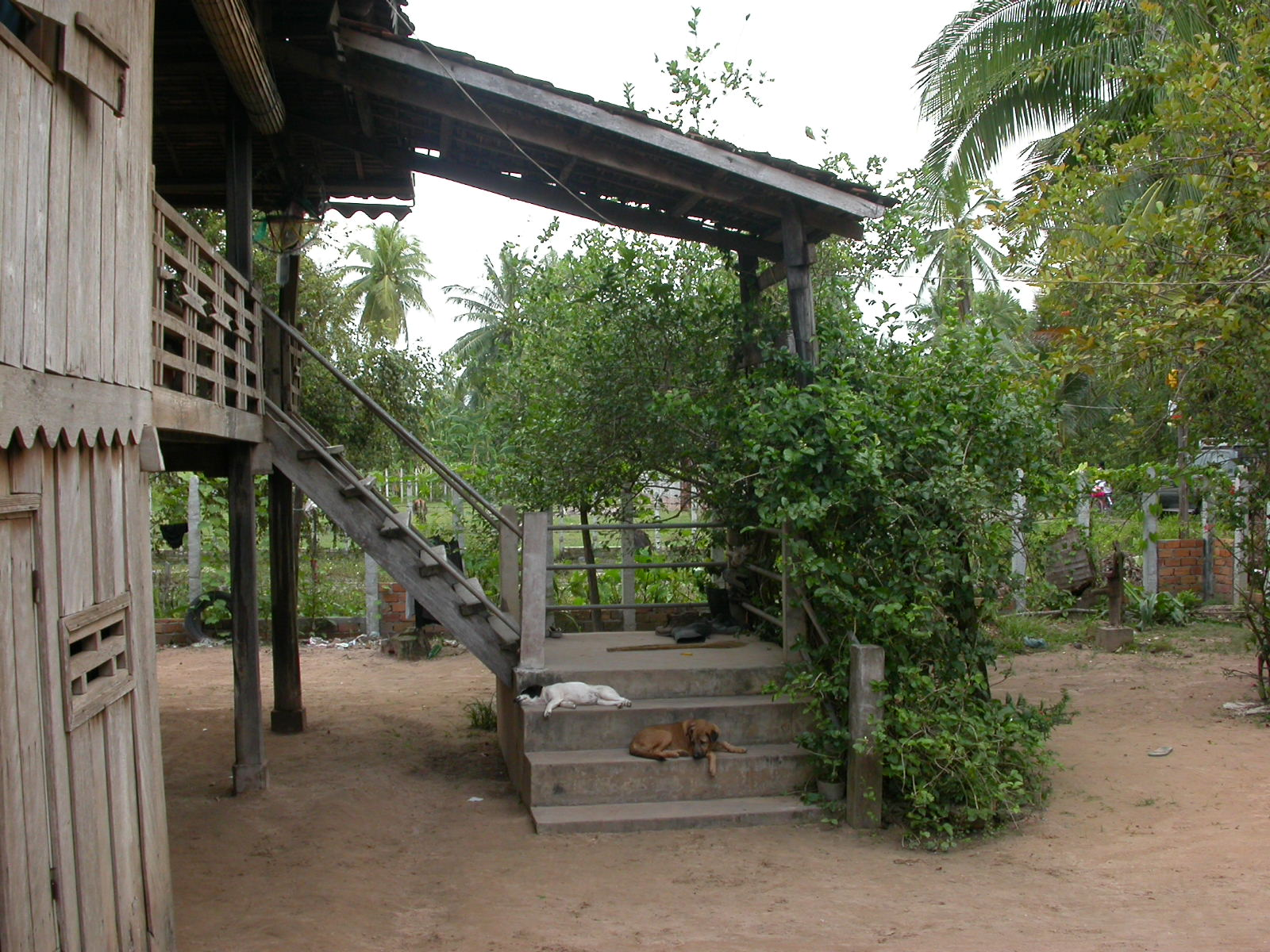

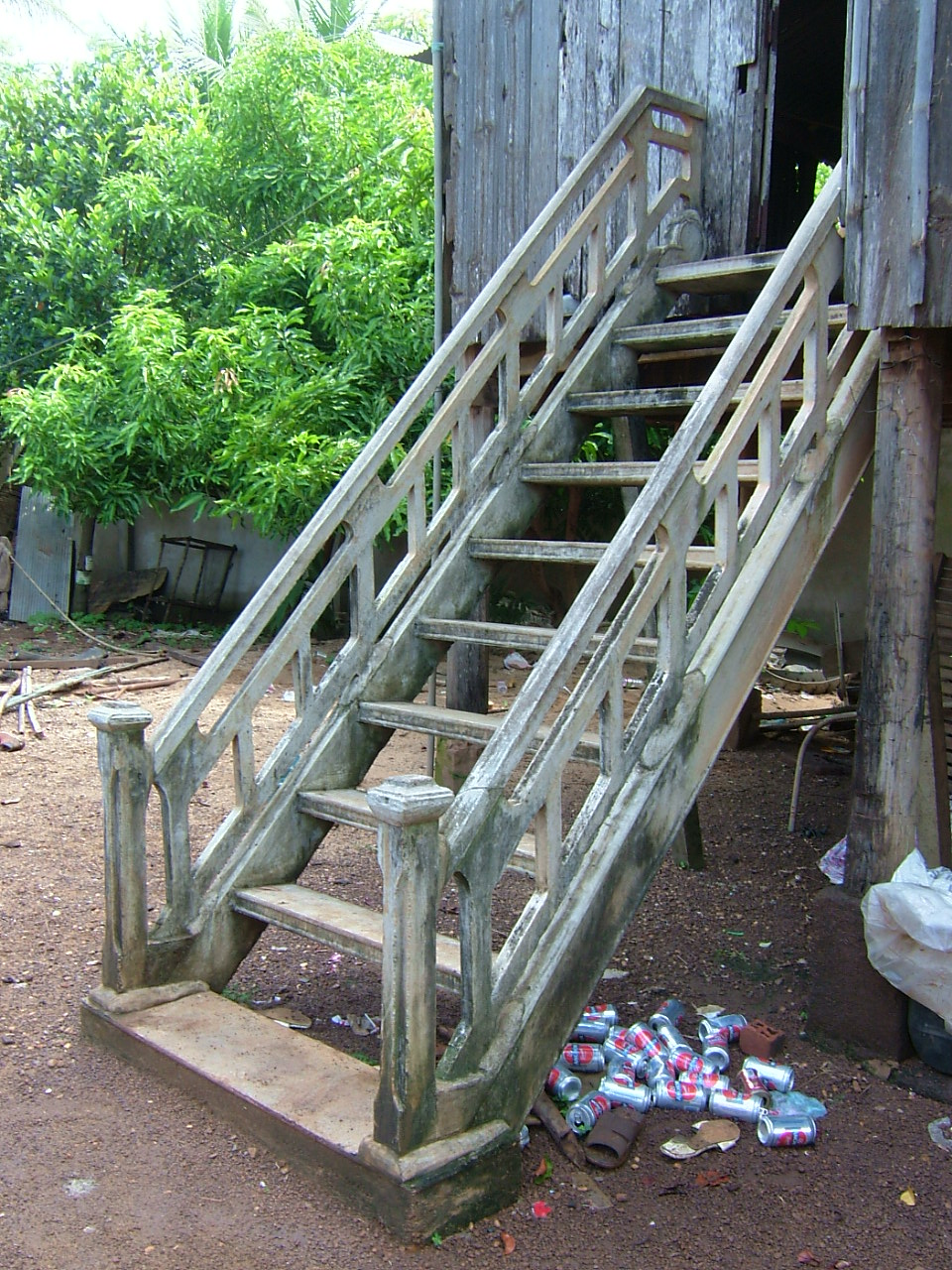

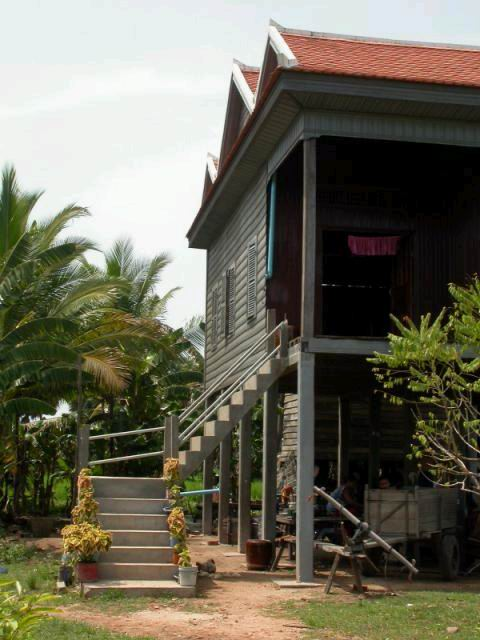

== Household and family structures ==
If there is a kitchen it is located at the back of the house, generally a few steps lower than the upper floor. Often the kitchen is situated in a separate building near the house, usually behind it.

Toilet facilities consist of simple pits in the ground, located away from the house. When filled they are covered with earth.

Any livestock (pigs and poultry) is kept in cages, on the ground level. Rice farmers have water buffalo, which are kept in the area around the house.

=== Houses and health ===
In farming communities people do not seem to be particularly concerned about health. Unless the illness is due to an eating disorder, which can be dealt with by a change in diet, it is assumed that it is caused by spirits. Due to the collective consciousness of the community, illness may affect not only individuals, but entire households and villages. When this occurs, people believe that the spirits are not taking good care of them, so they move to another house for another 'contract'. They may even abandon a village for the same reason.

=== Furniture ===
People in Cambodia do not have much furniture. However, one item that is found in all houses is a multifunctional low table, which is used for sleeping, sitting, talking and working. Different styles of tables are found both upstairs and downstairs – always within the area of the house itself; on the ground level it is a vital element of daily life. A hammock is used for sleeping during the daytime and is the most relaxing and comfortable piece of furniture. On the upper floor the same type of table-like furniture is used as a bed.

In more urban surroundings, people may have a simple type of sideboard on which they place items of importance: a television, a Buddha shrine, a battery operated light, mobile phones, as well as photographs of their grandparents and members of the family who have died. Because of the spatial organisation of the basic Khmer house, furniture is placed alongside the walls within the personal space of the inhabitants. The central area is always left free and is used as a common room.

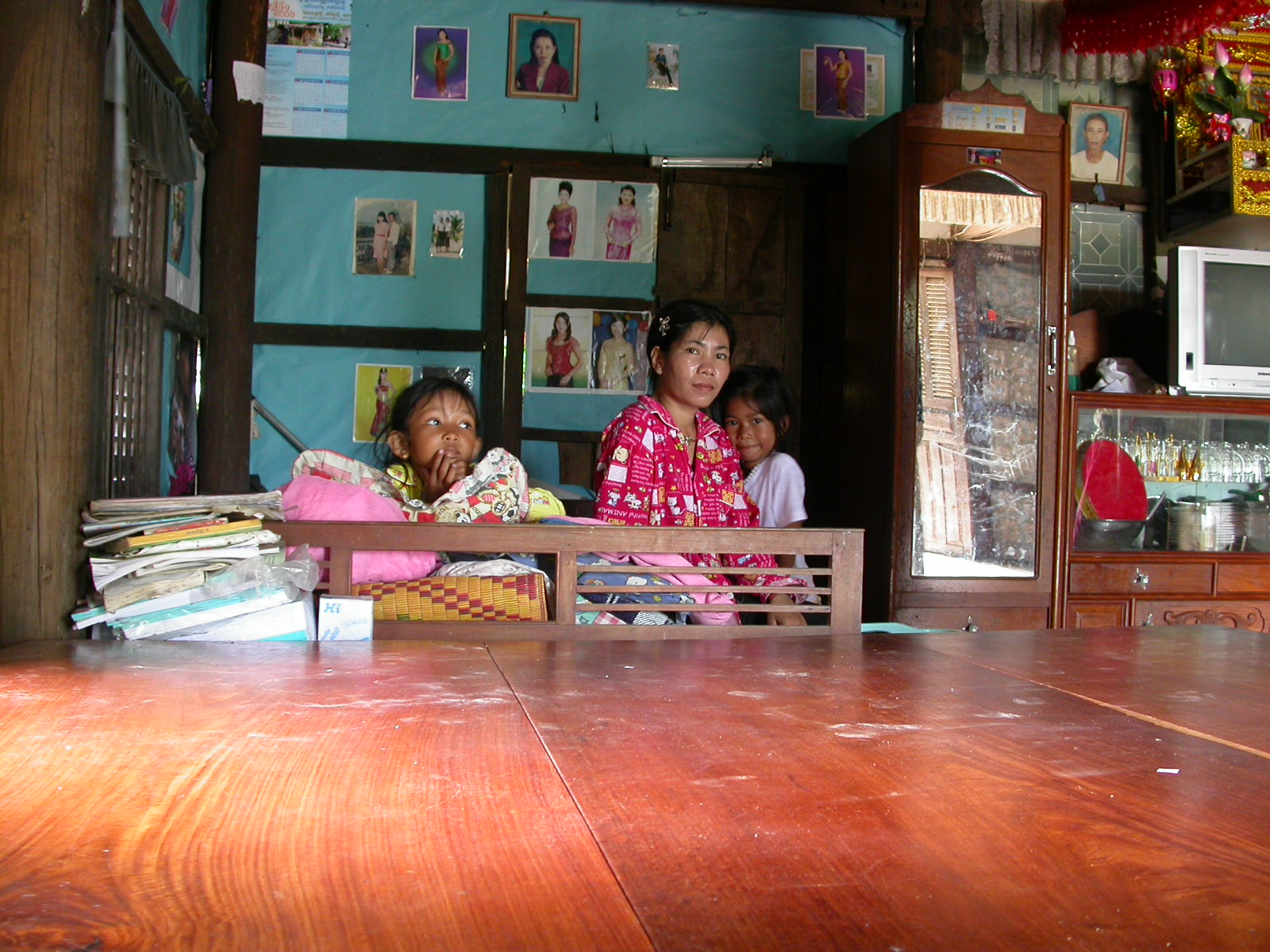

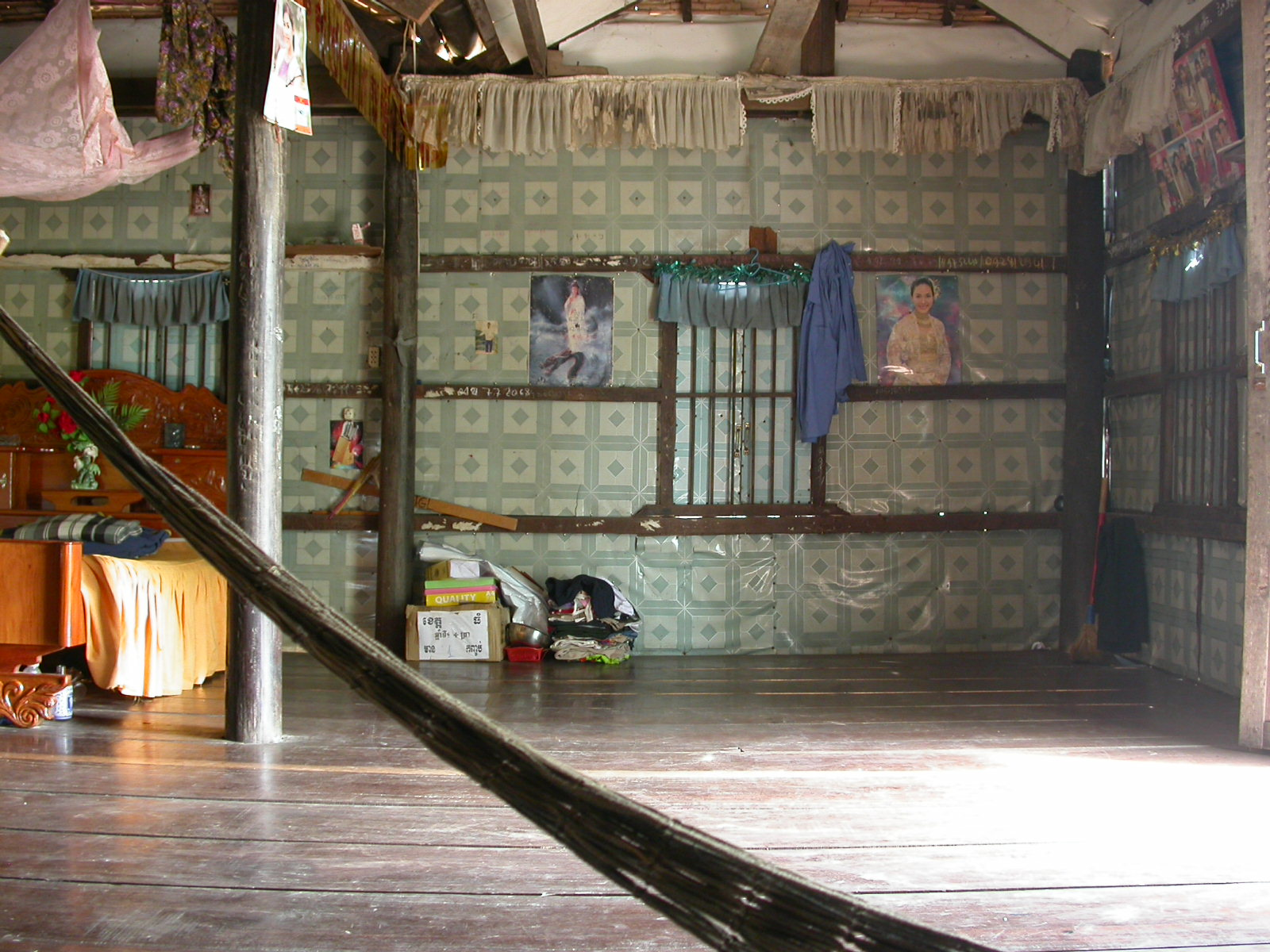

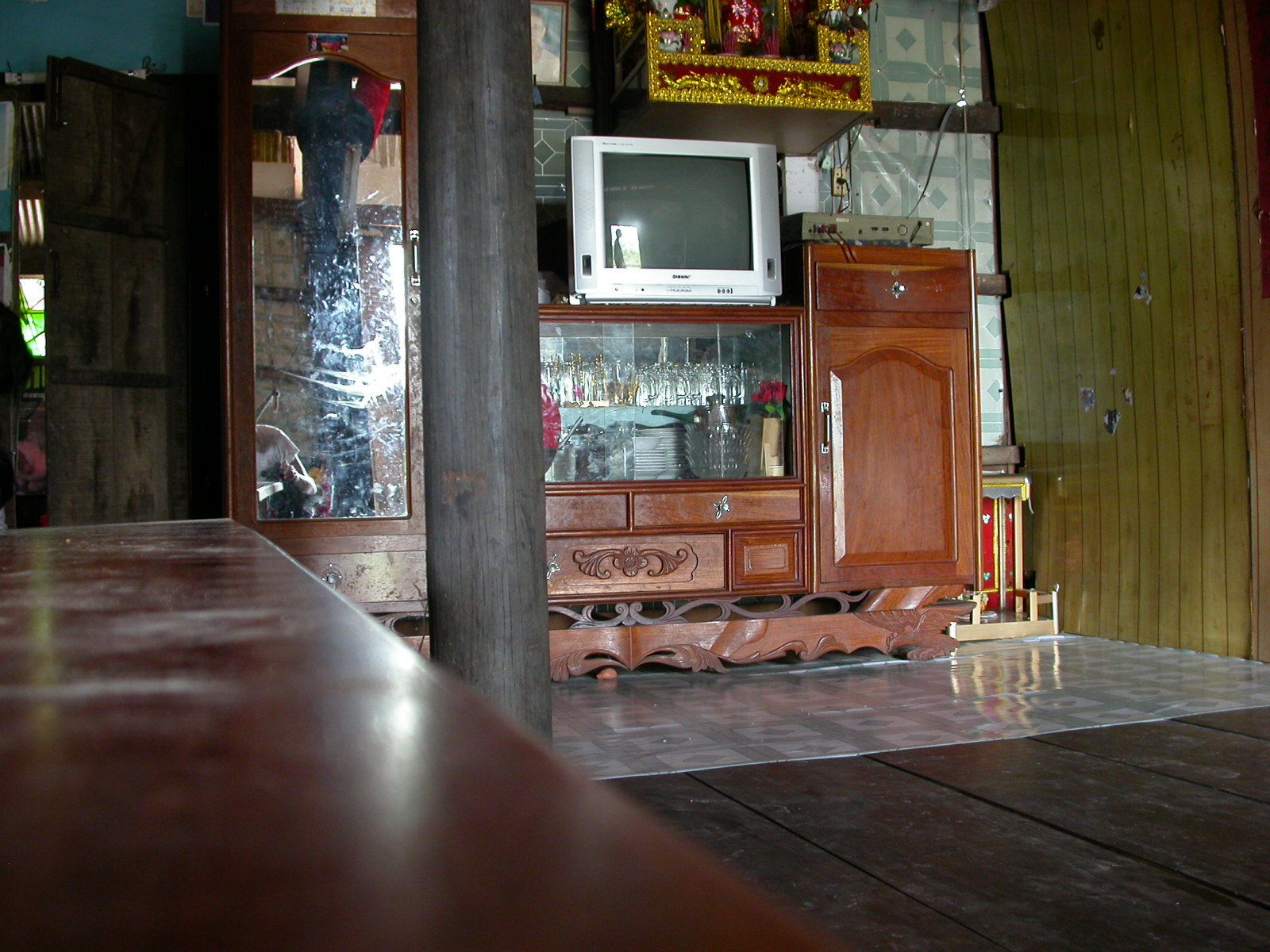

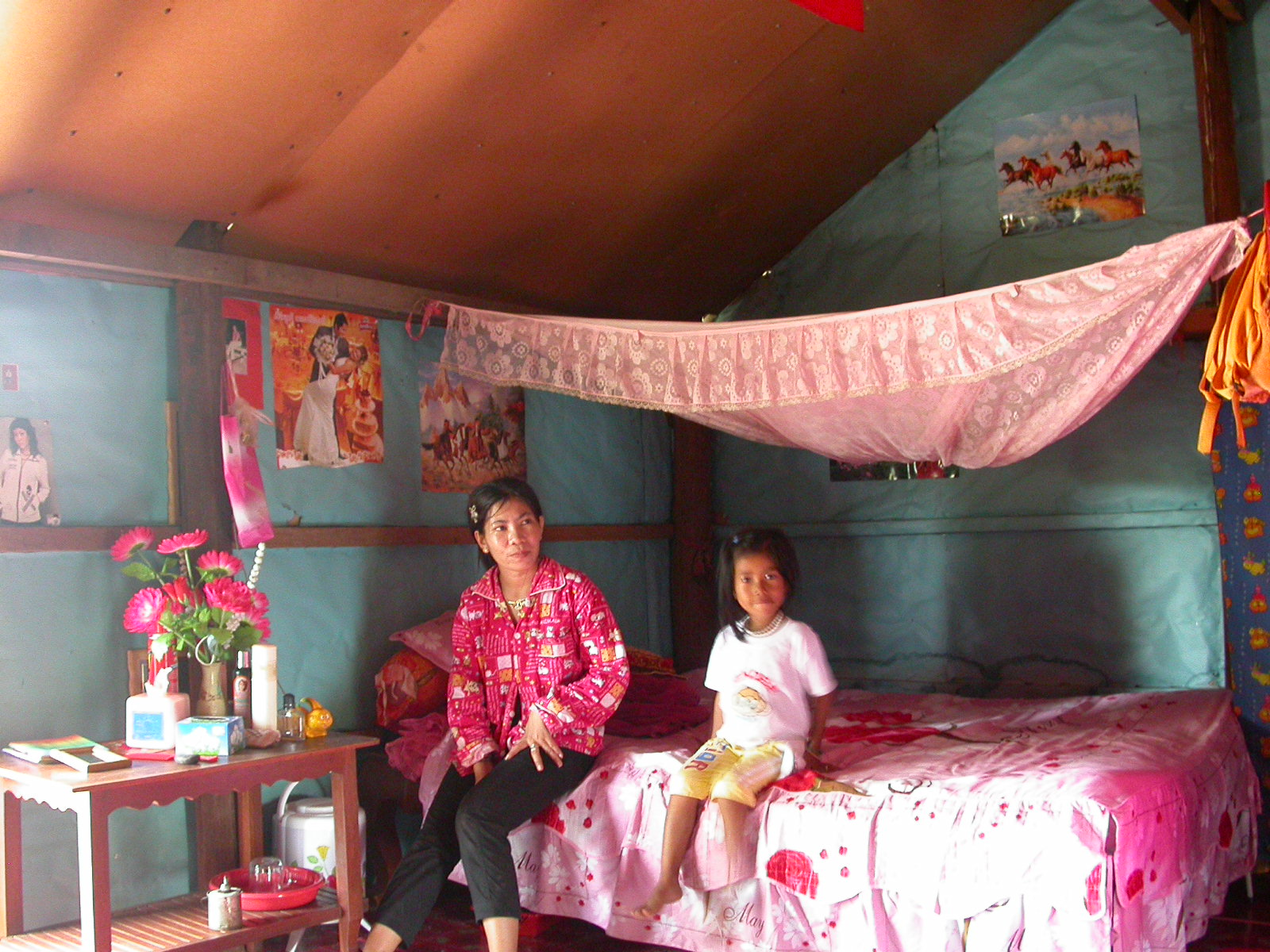

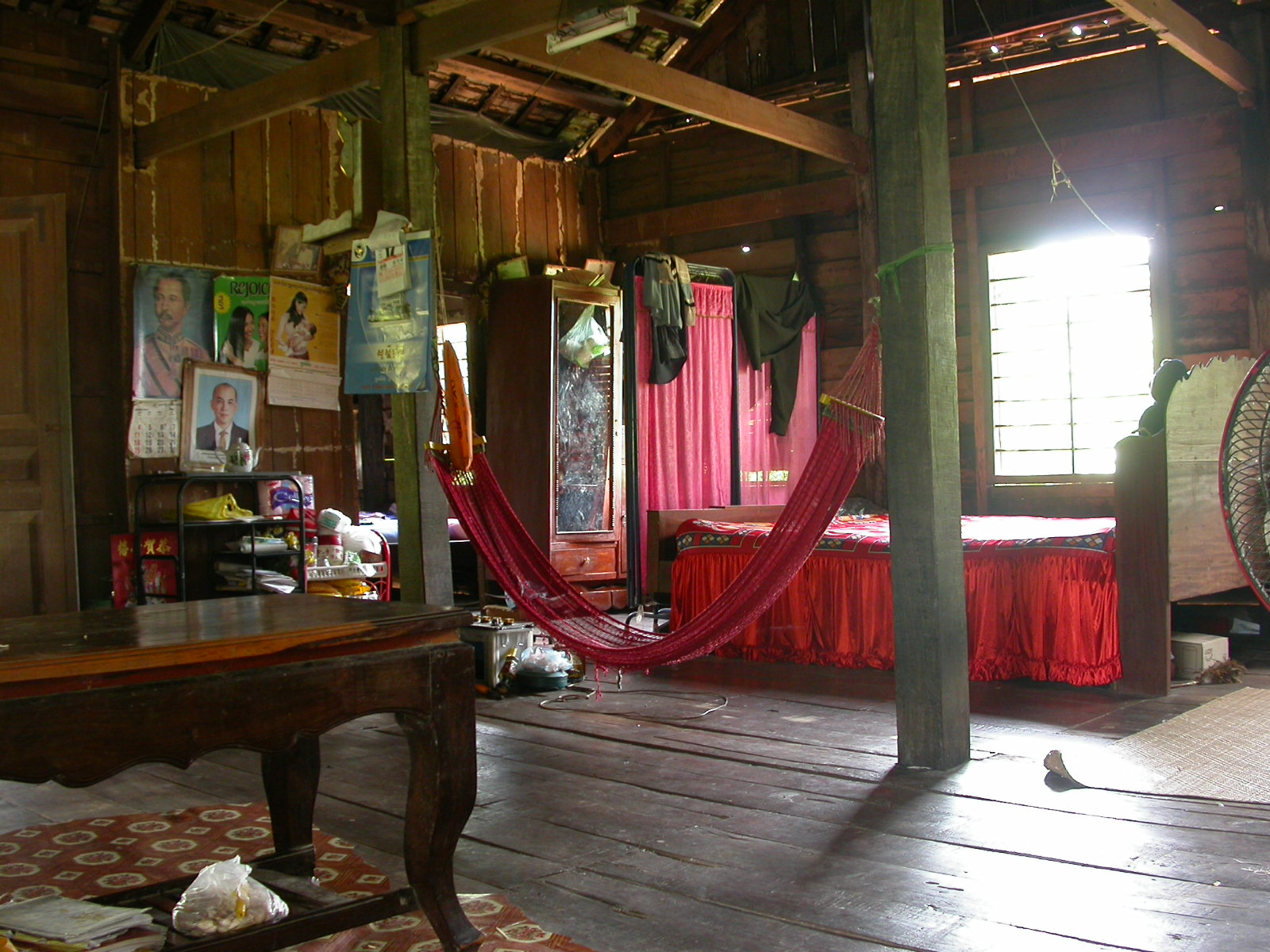

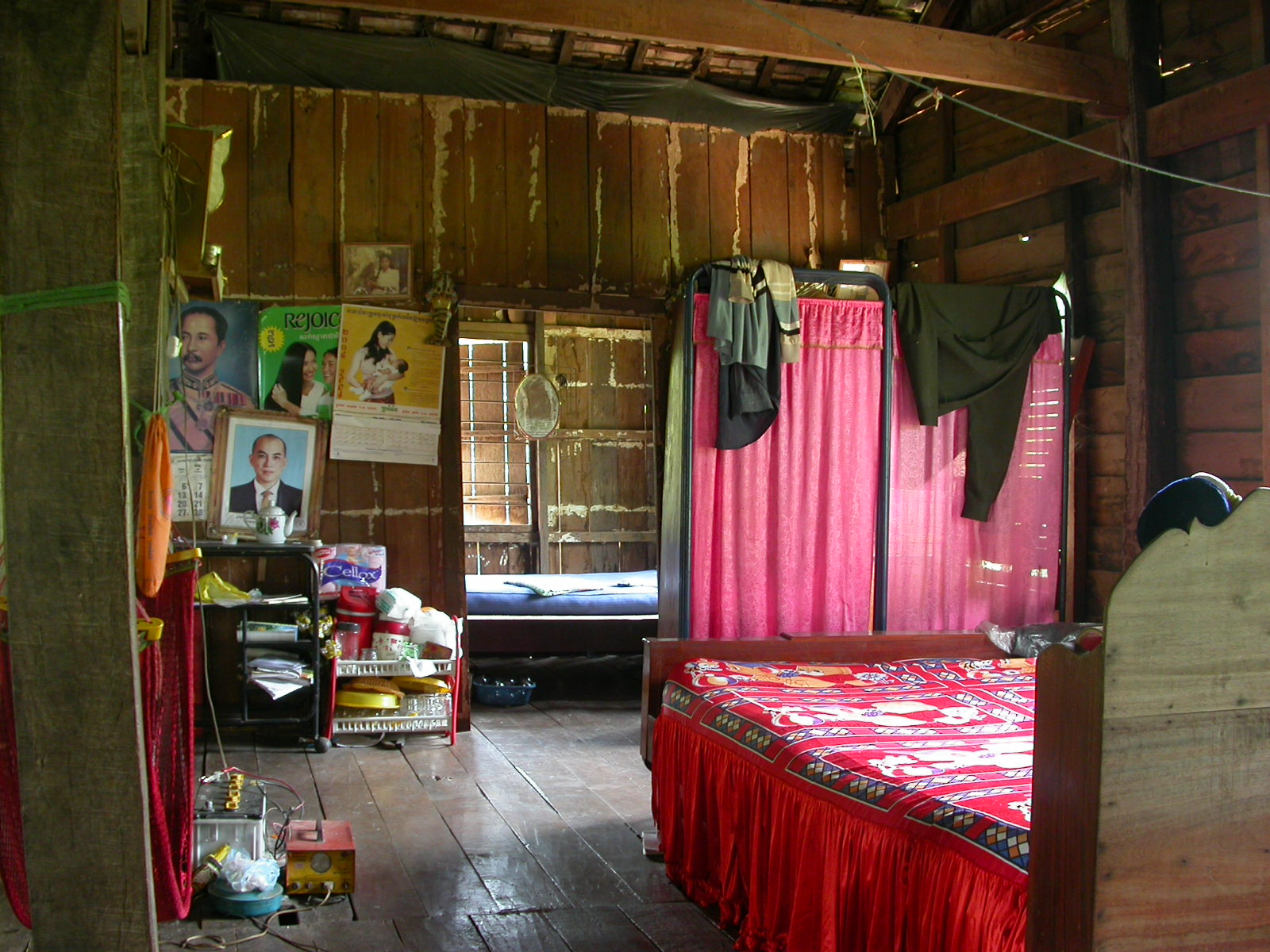

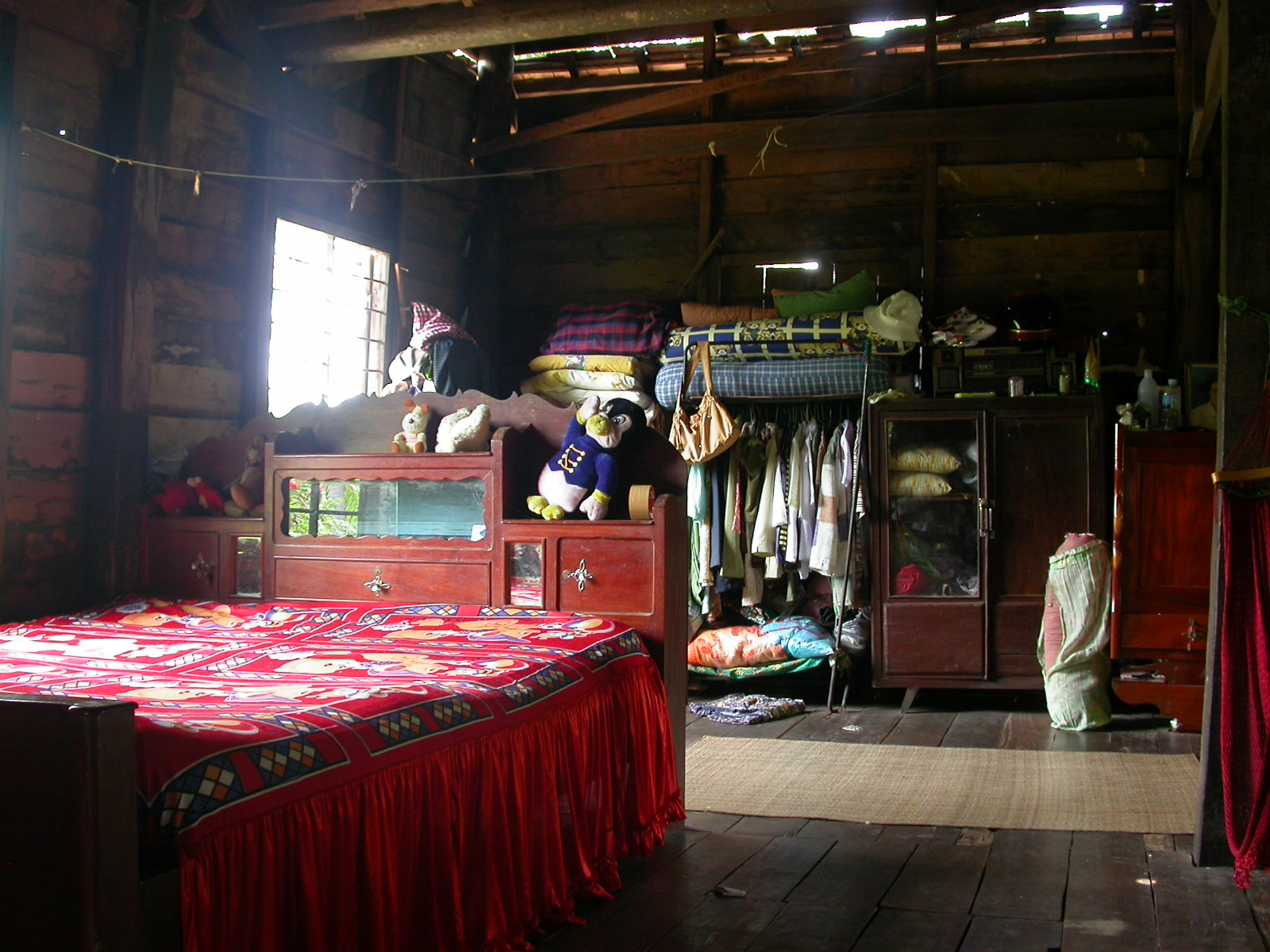

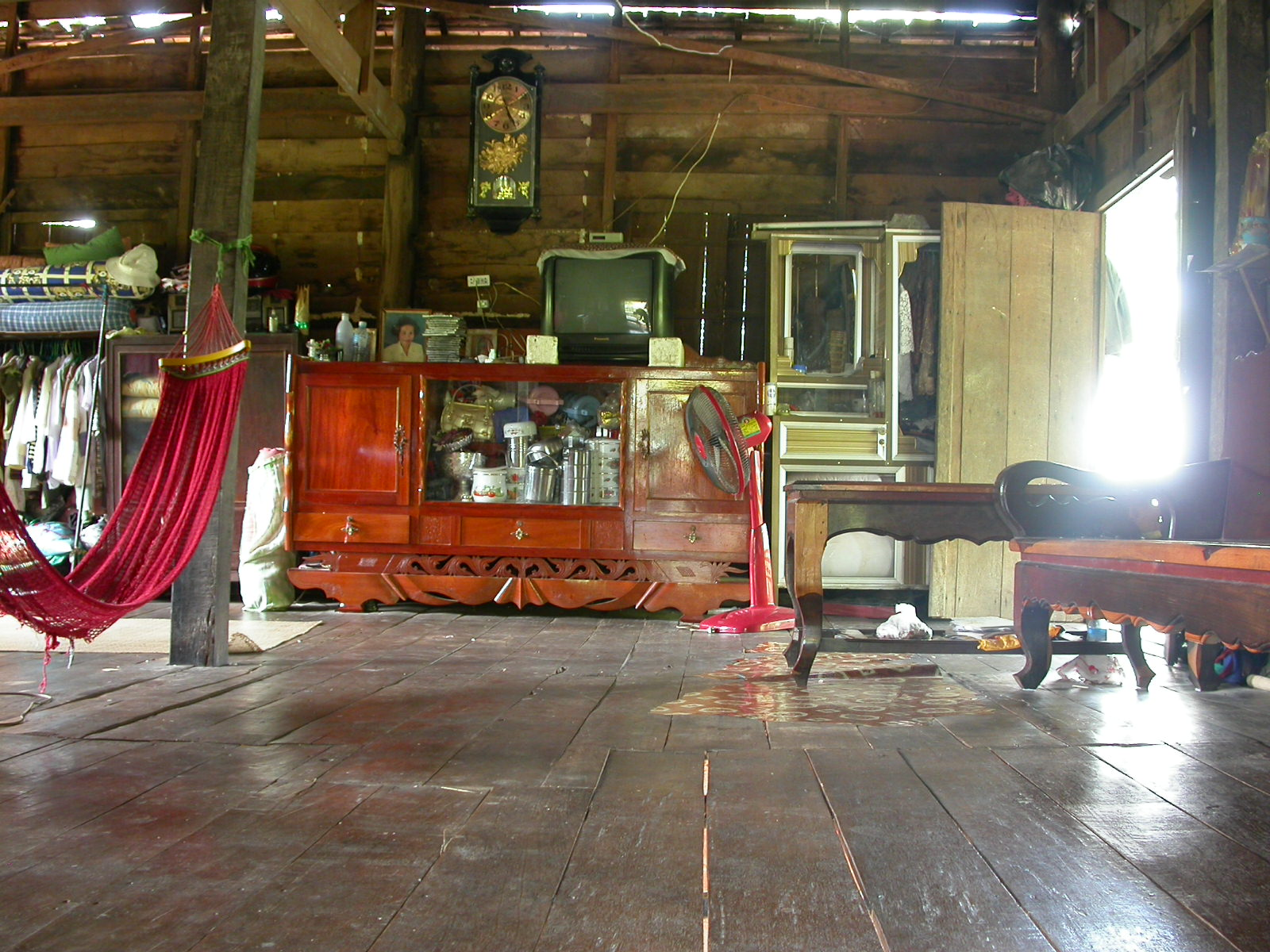

== The house in its setting ==
Nowadays the plot of a rural Khmer house is situated between the main street, to the front, and the rice fields at the back. In a busy thoroughfare, there is often a small shop, which consists of a simple wooden shelter beside the street, where all kinds of goods are sold. A party political sign may be displayed outside the house on the street side. A water channel separates the site from the street; here buffalo drink, and lotus plants are able to grow.

With increasing urbanisation, this channel serves to drain excess water from the ground when seasonal rainfall causes flooding. Generally, a well, which provides drinking water, can be found on one side at the front of the house. A Buddha shrine welcomes visitors. The bare ground in front of the house serves as the main working area for any major task requiring plenty of space: rice is spread here to dry (sometimes it is even spread on the warm asphalt of the road); rice threshing takes place here, and milling, as well as all kinds of repair work.

The house itself is situated on the highest part of the site. It is essential that the main working area on the ground level is not flooded during the monsoon rains. Banana trees and coconut palms grow beside and mainly behind the house. Vegetables may also be cultivated. Vegetation around the house helps to shelter the house from the intense sunshine, as well as forming a break against powerful winds or storms.

Depending on the amount of space available, a clay house for rice storage is situated at the back or to the side of the house. If pigs are kept, their sty will also be in this area. The back of the house is used as a private space: toilet pits are dug here for example; garbage is also deposited here. The area at the back of the house is often used to store palm leaves, and all types of material that are not being used for the time being; there is less activity here than at the front of the house.

When children marry, or other relatives move into the household, further separate buildings are built beside the main house. To begin with, when money or building material is scarce, additional family members often live in a temporary shelter on the ground beside or behind the main building. A new building is erected as soon as circumstances permit. Due to lack of money or shortage of building materials such buildings are generally smaller than the main house.

All settlements are arranged in a similar fashion, in a linear pattern along a road. In more densely populated villages, which lack direct access to the rice fields and are cut off from main roads, dwellings remain independent from each other, separated by a garden with banana trees, coconut palms and a vegetable plot. In these circumstances the rice fields are situated outside the village.

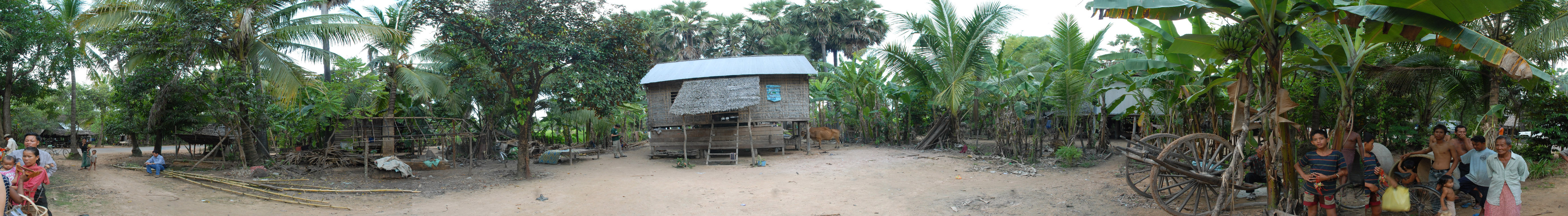
A panoramic photograph of a Rural Khmer house.
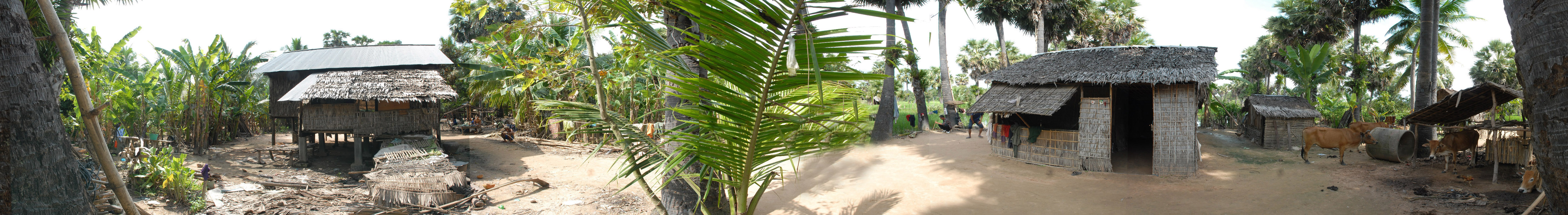
A panoramic photograph of Rural Khmer house.
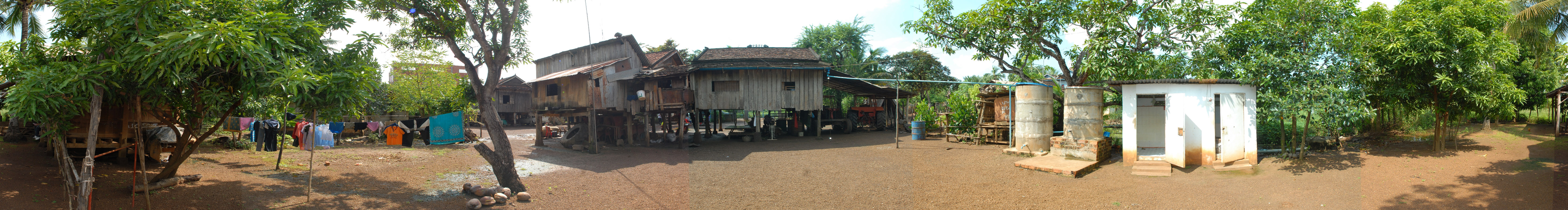
A panoramic photograph of Rural Khmer house.

== Constructional details ==
Typology of Khmer house

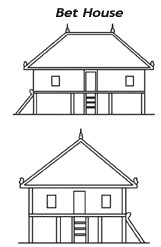

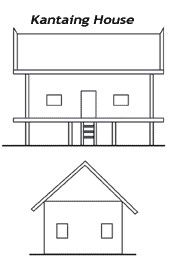

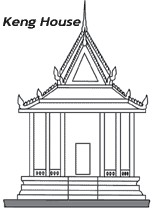

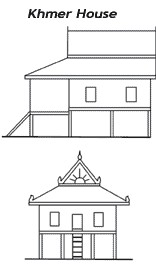

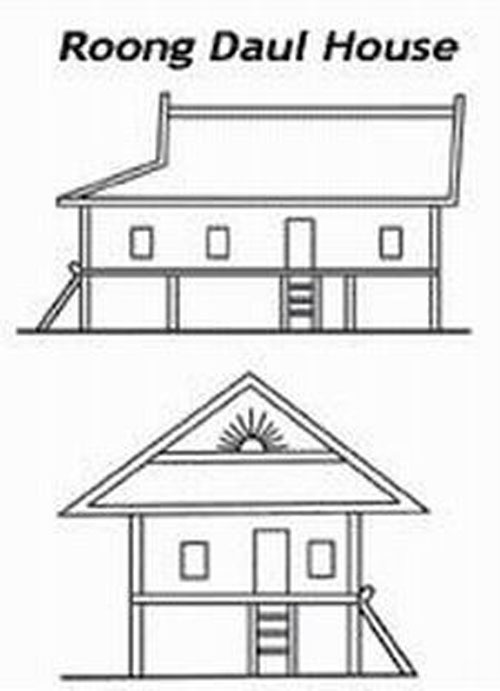

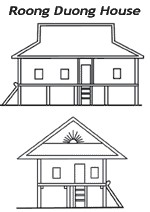

=== Main characteristics ===
The building consists of a supporting framework, which stands on individual foundations. There are no bracing or shear walls to strengthen the structure. The roof is built before wall cladding is applied.

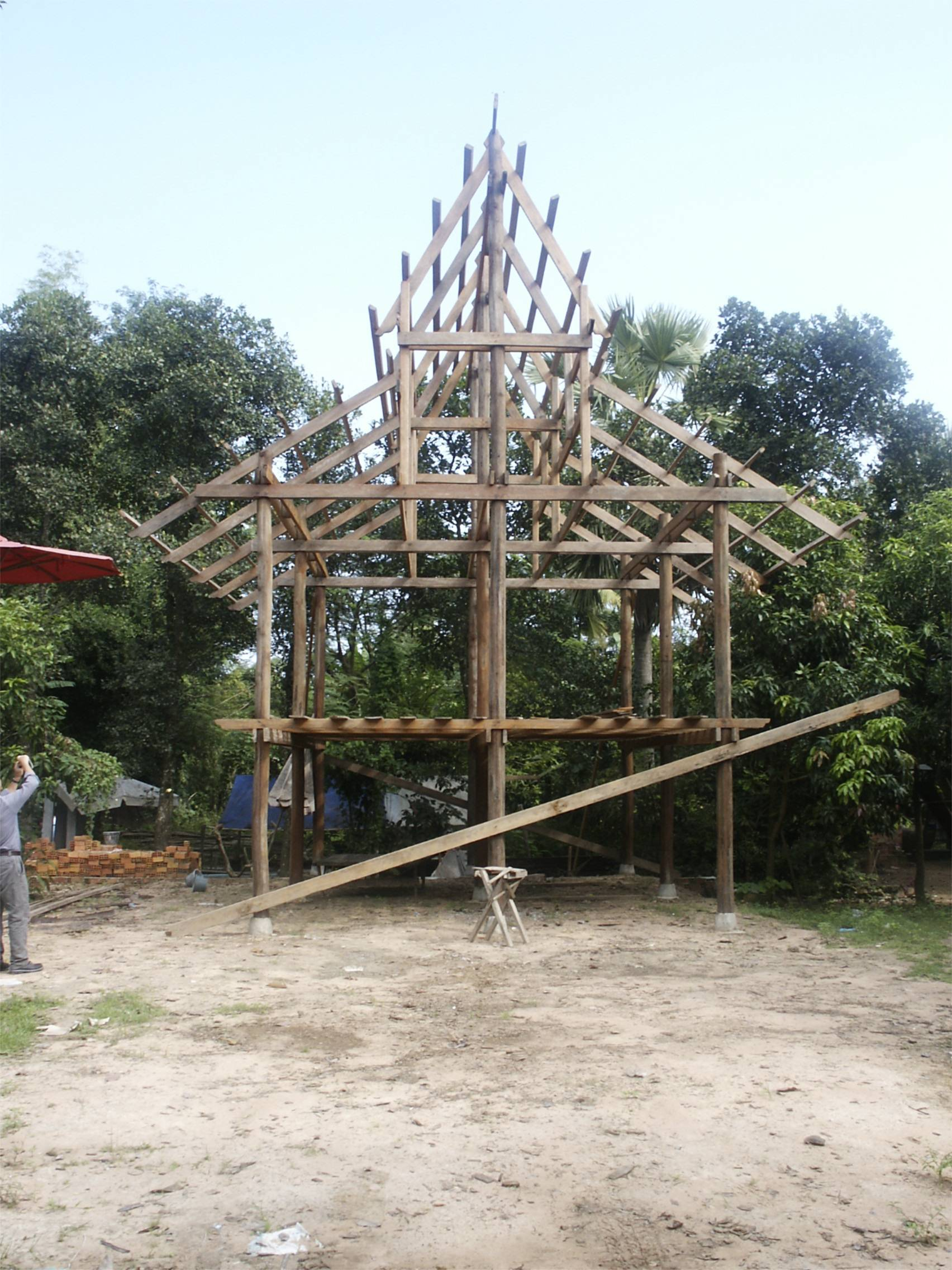

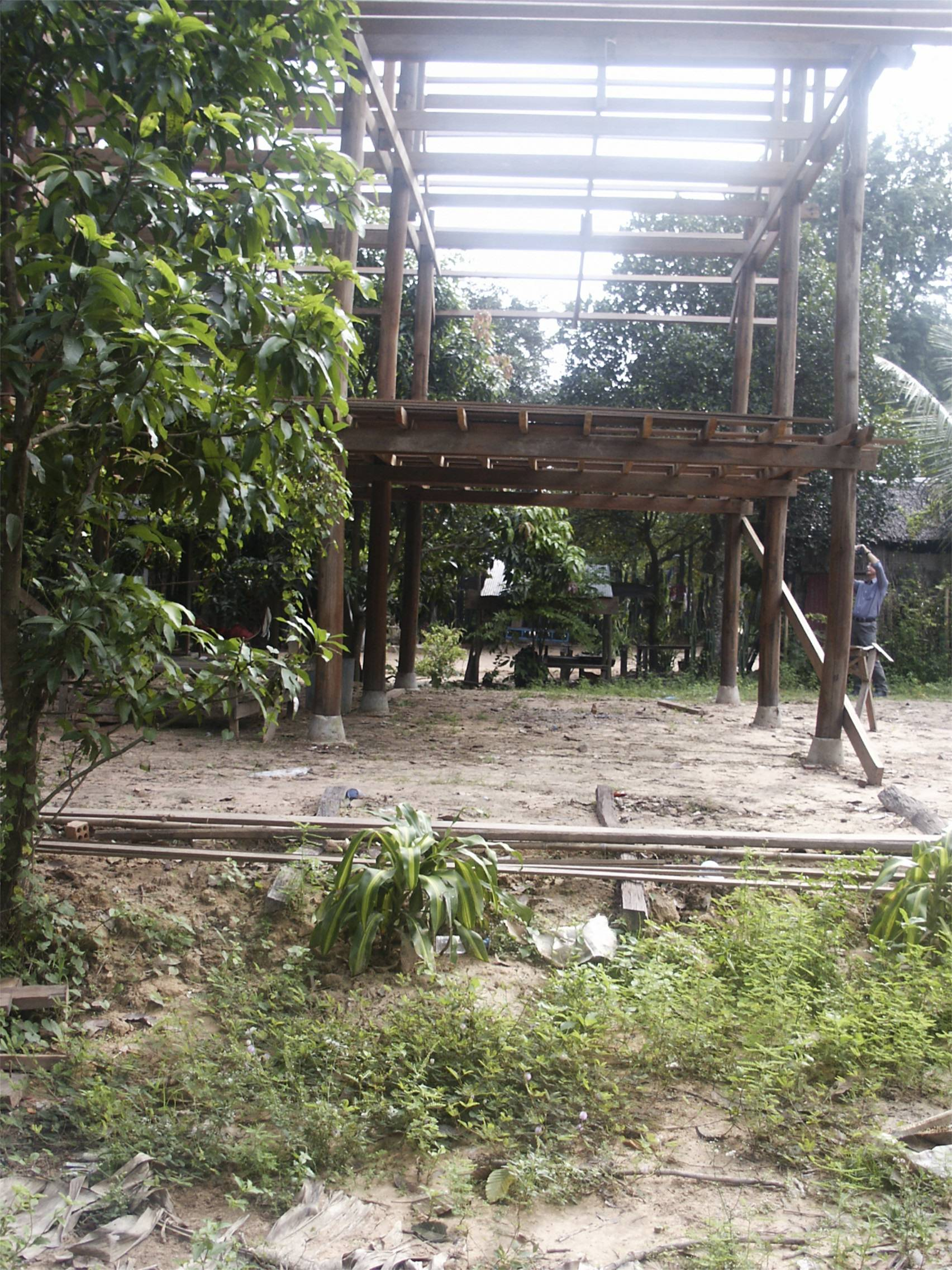

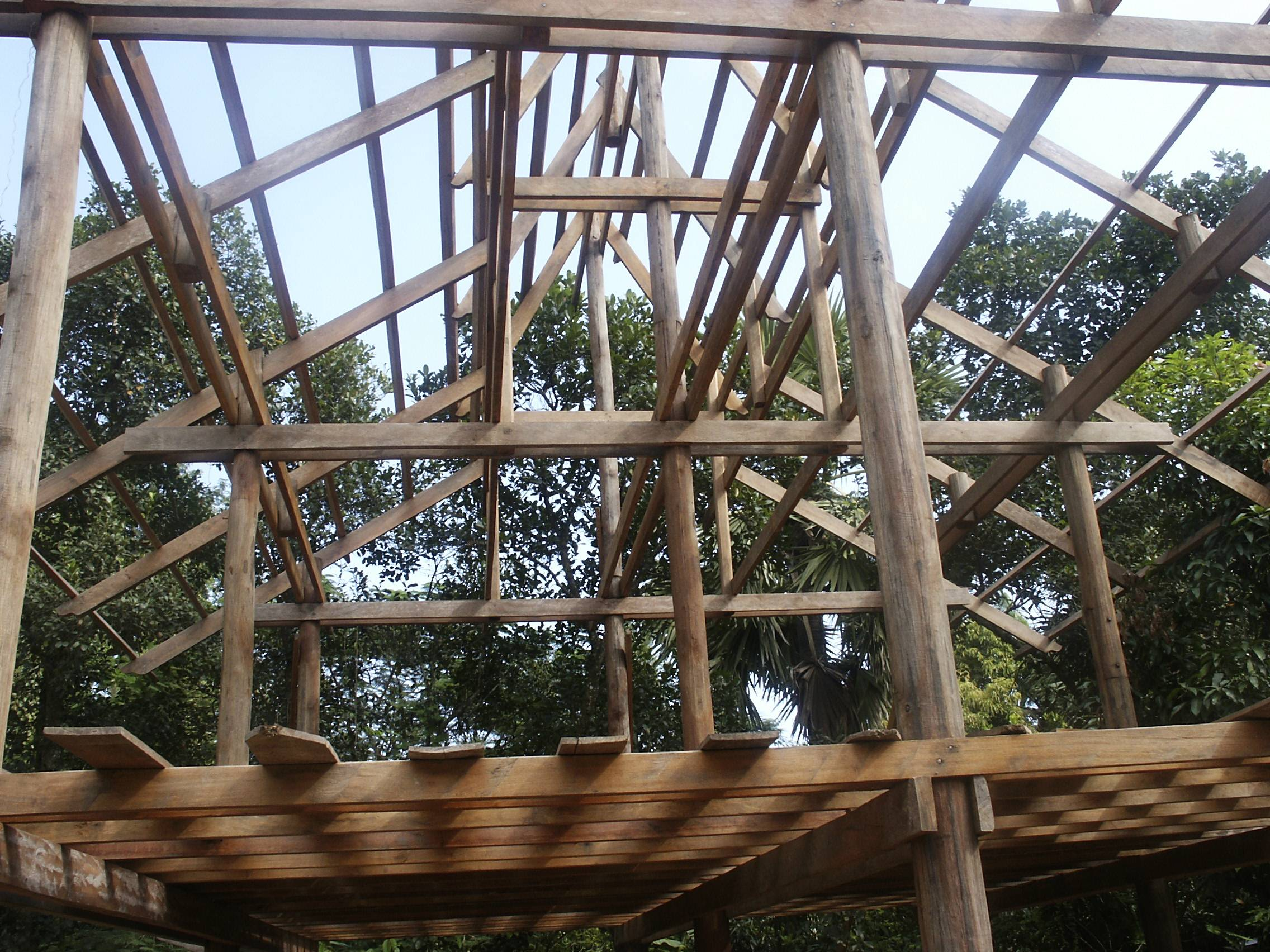

=== Foundations ===
The load-bearing piles of the building stand on single foundations. To comply with the specific conditions of the generally loamy soils, single foundations are laid in the following manner: At the bottom of a 1 metre deep excavation several wooden poles of 1.5 – 2.00 metres length are rammed into the ground and then covered with a layer of compacted stone, followed by a hewn stone or prefabricated concrete slab, which provides the base for the pile. The excavation is then filled with soil. In a modern version the single foundations are linked with concrete slabs and prefabricated pillars extending to the upper floor are used.

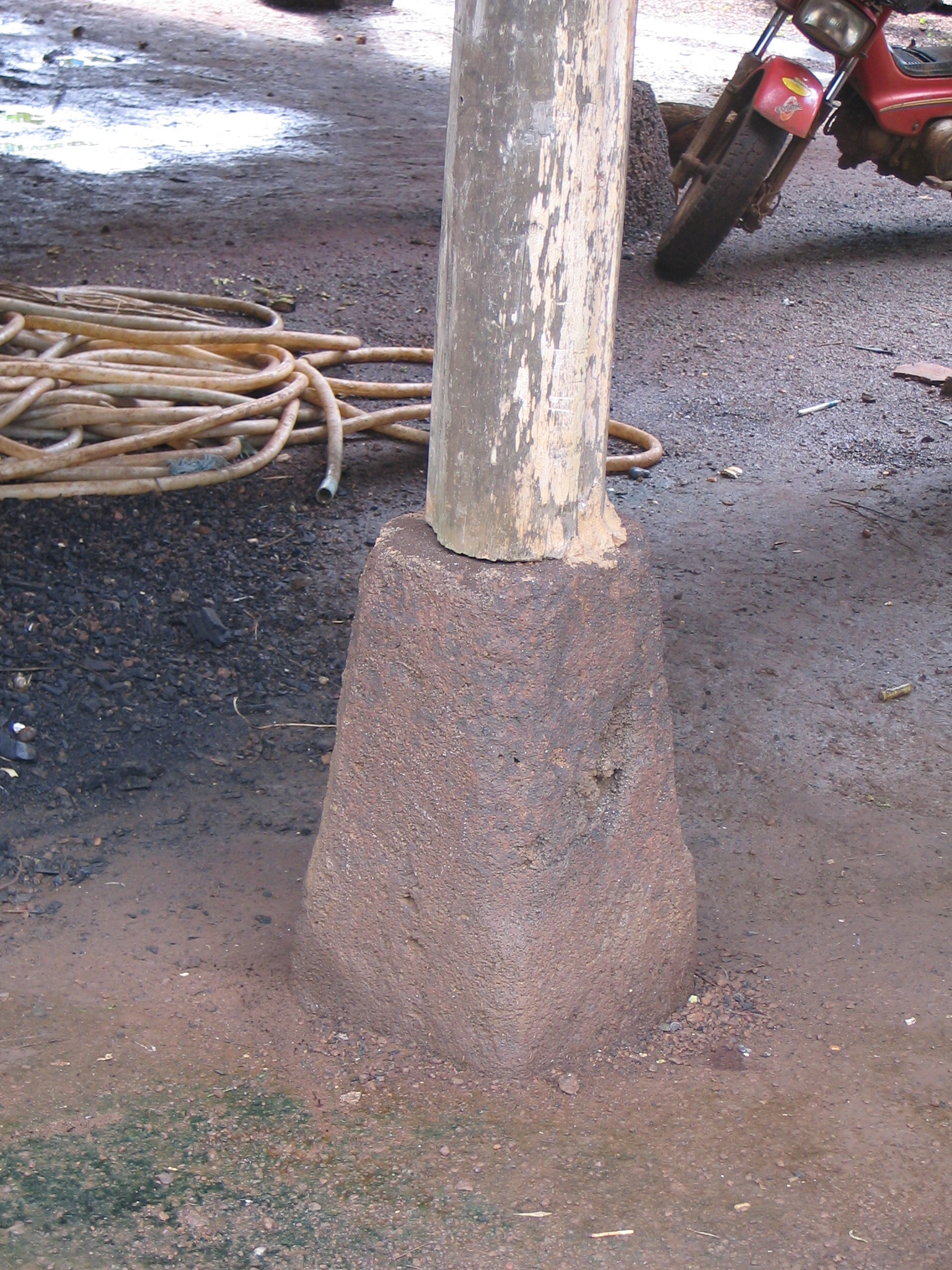

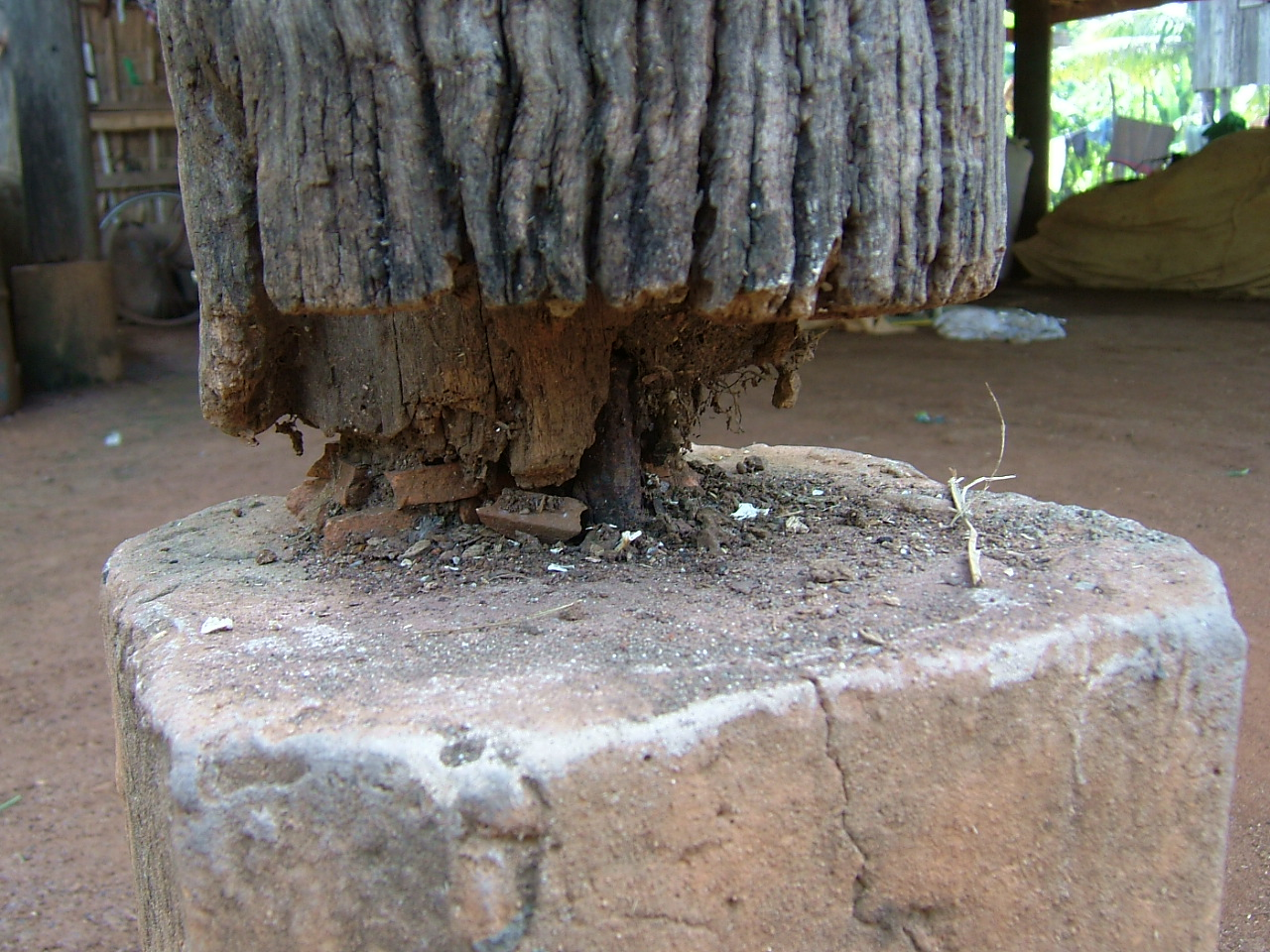

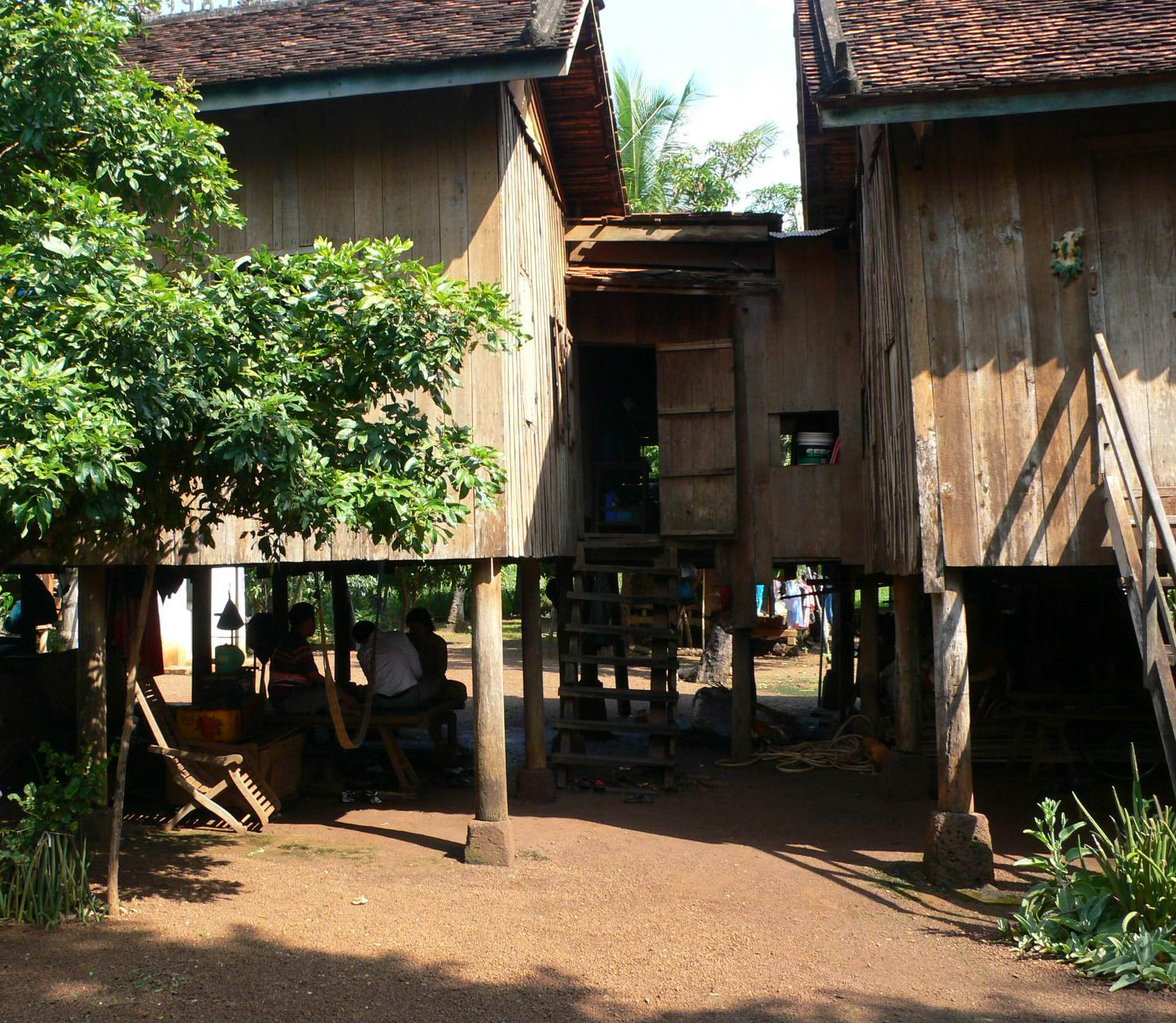

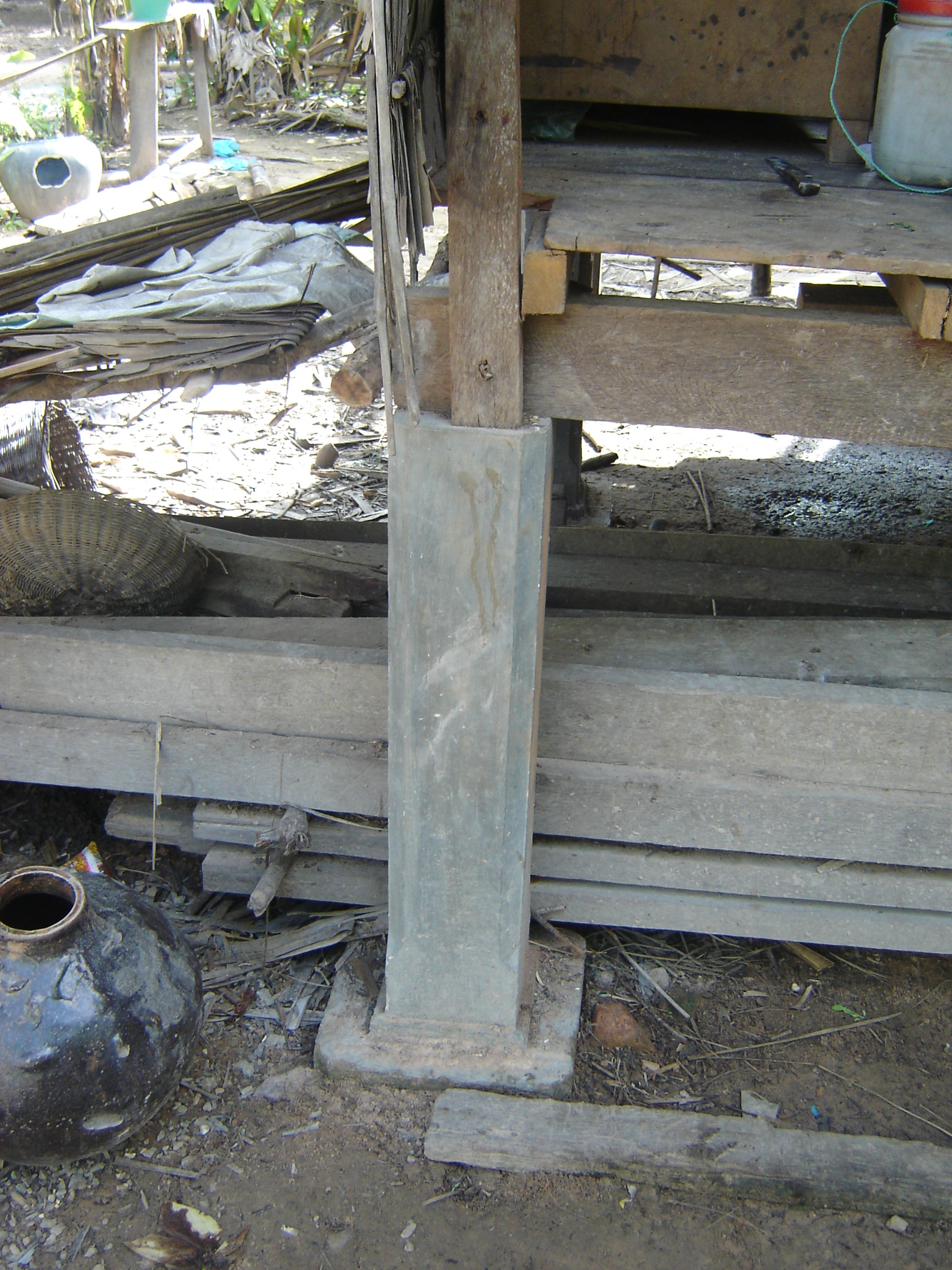

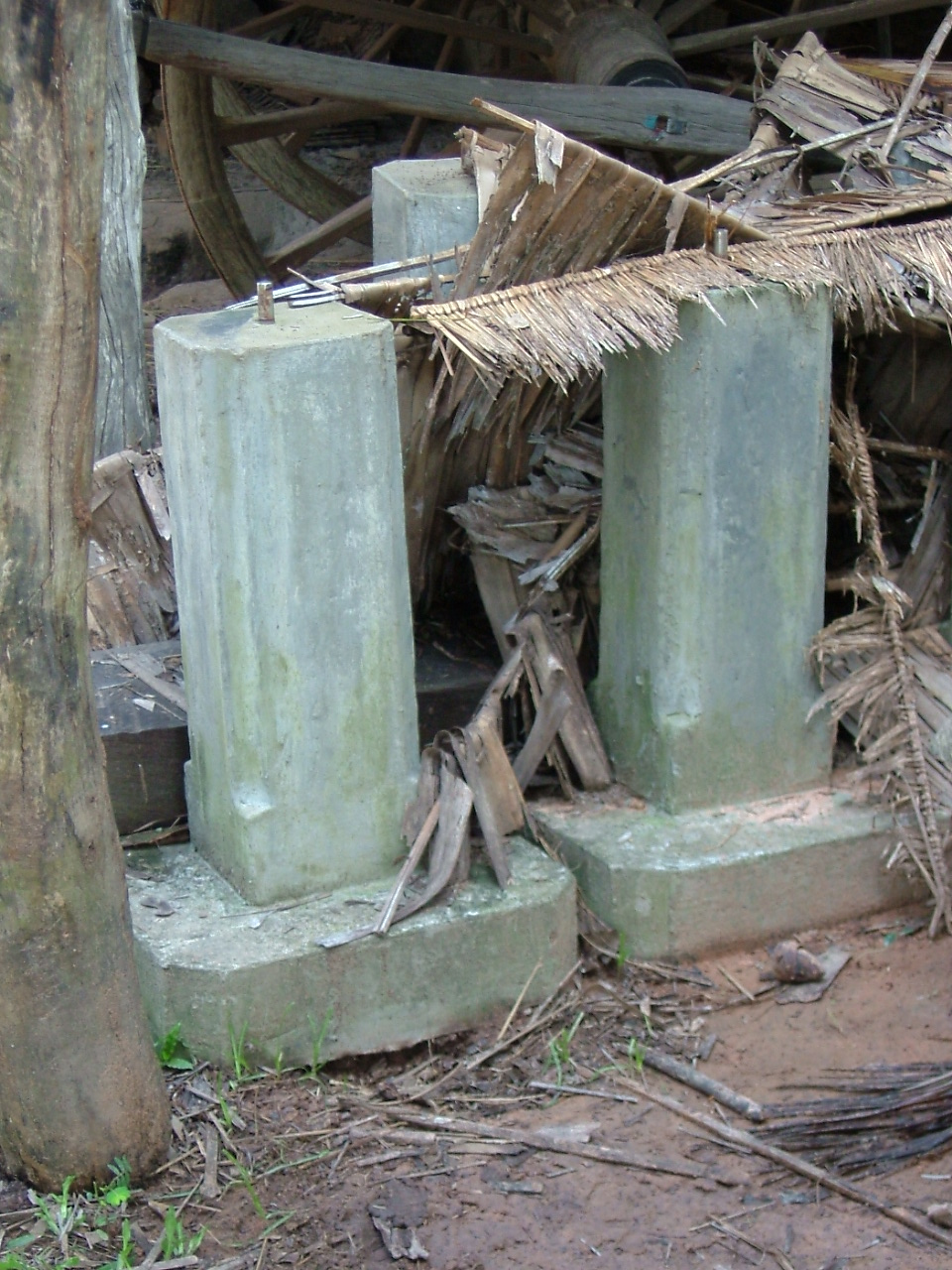

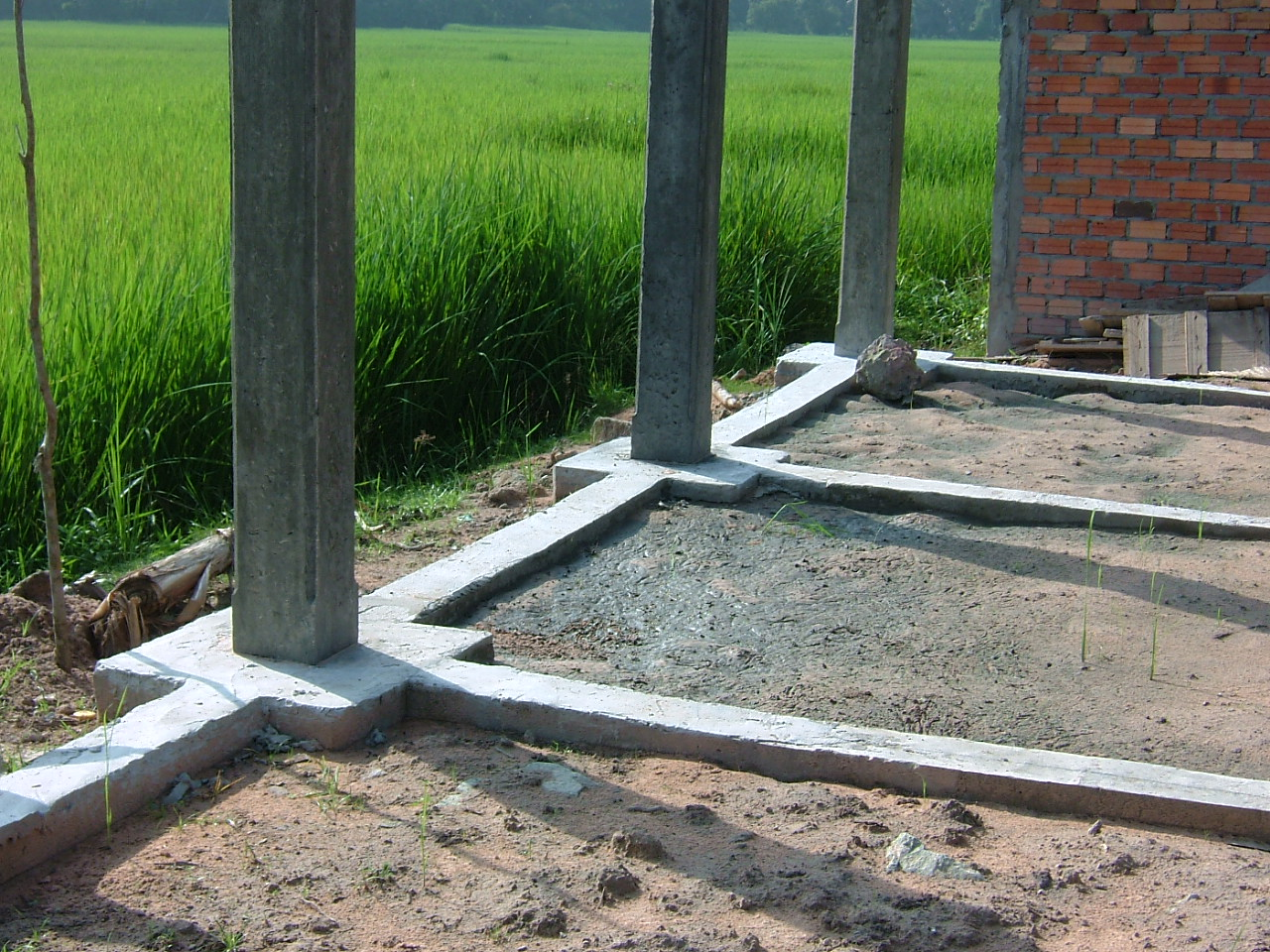

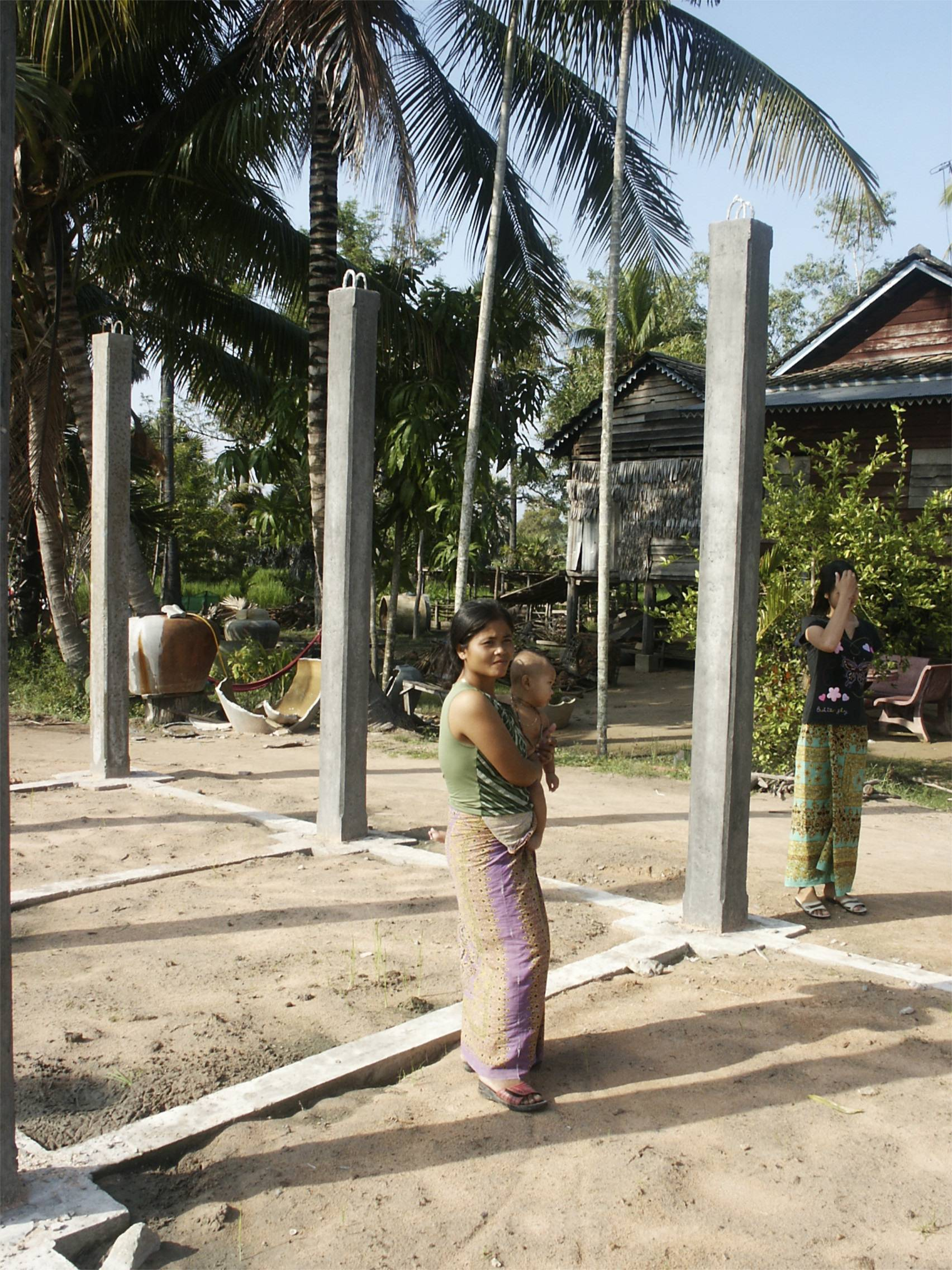

=== Piles ===
For each pile, a single round hardwood tree trunk is used. Extending from the foundation to the roof, and in the centre as far as the roof ridge, the piles, together with the horizontal joists, form the bearing structure of the house.

=== Joists ===
Rectangular-sawn hardwood (such as ...) is used for the joists. In earlier built, traditional houses these continuous elements run through the vertical piles, whereas in more modern houses joists consist of two elements running either side of the piles.

The distance of the joists cannot use for a long distance (From 2 m to 3.75) for the Khmer house structure because it is easy to crack or bend while we use over load. So, the technical of Khmer house almost use the wood as a principle materials.

=== Roof ===
Piles, joists and rafters, on which battens are laid, are linked together to form a rigid roof truss. This construction helps to stabilise the whole structure of the house and can be described as a rigid prism on stilts.

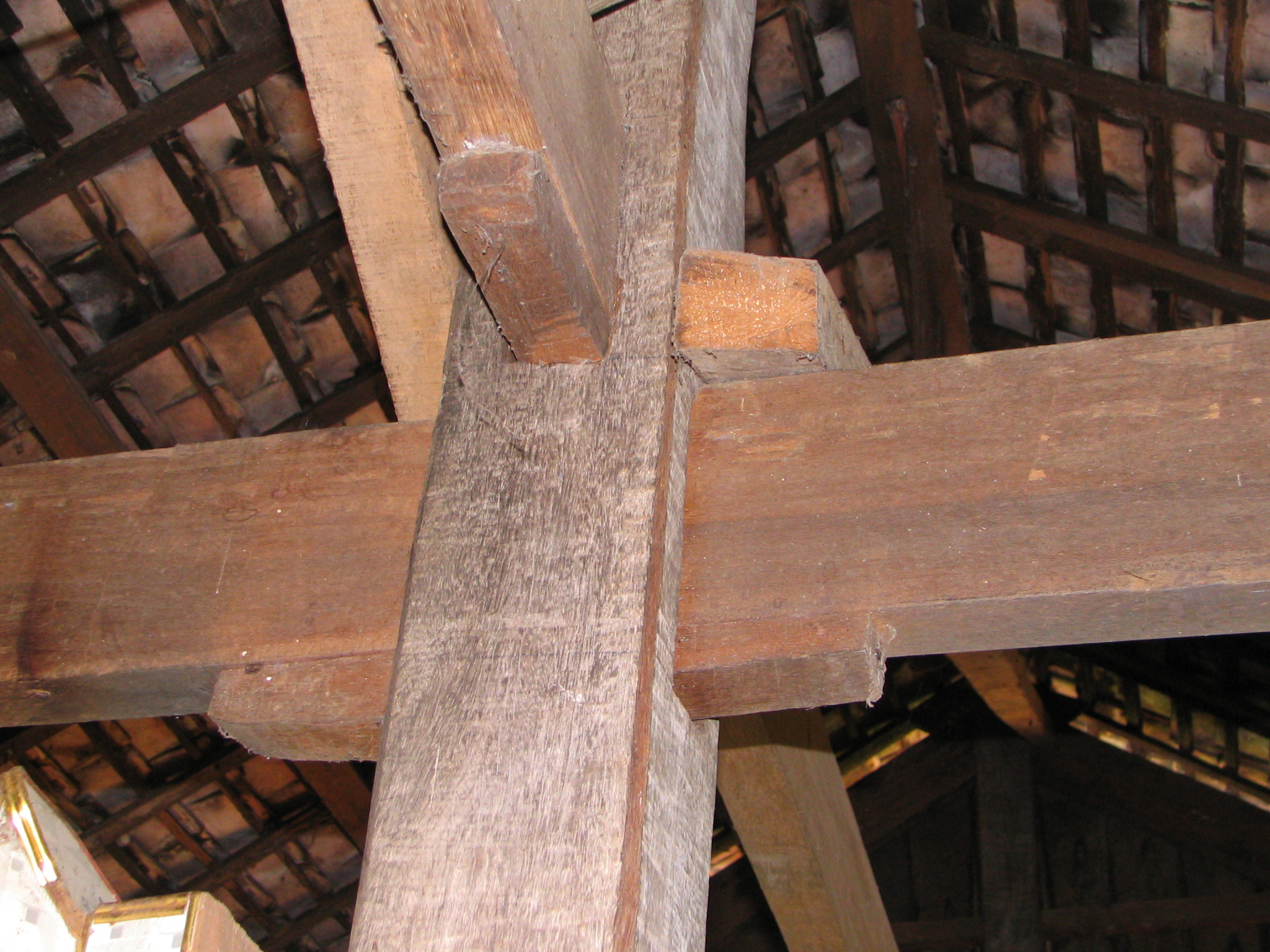
Piles

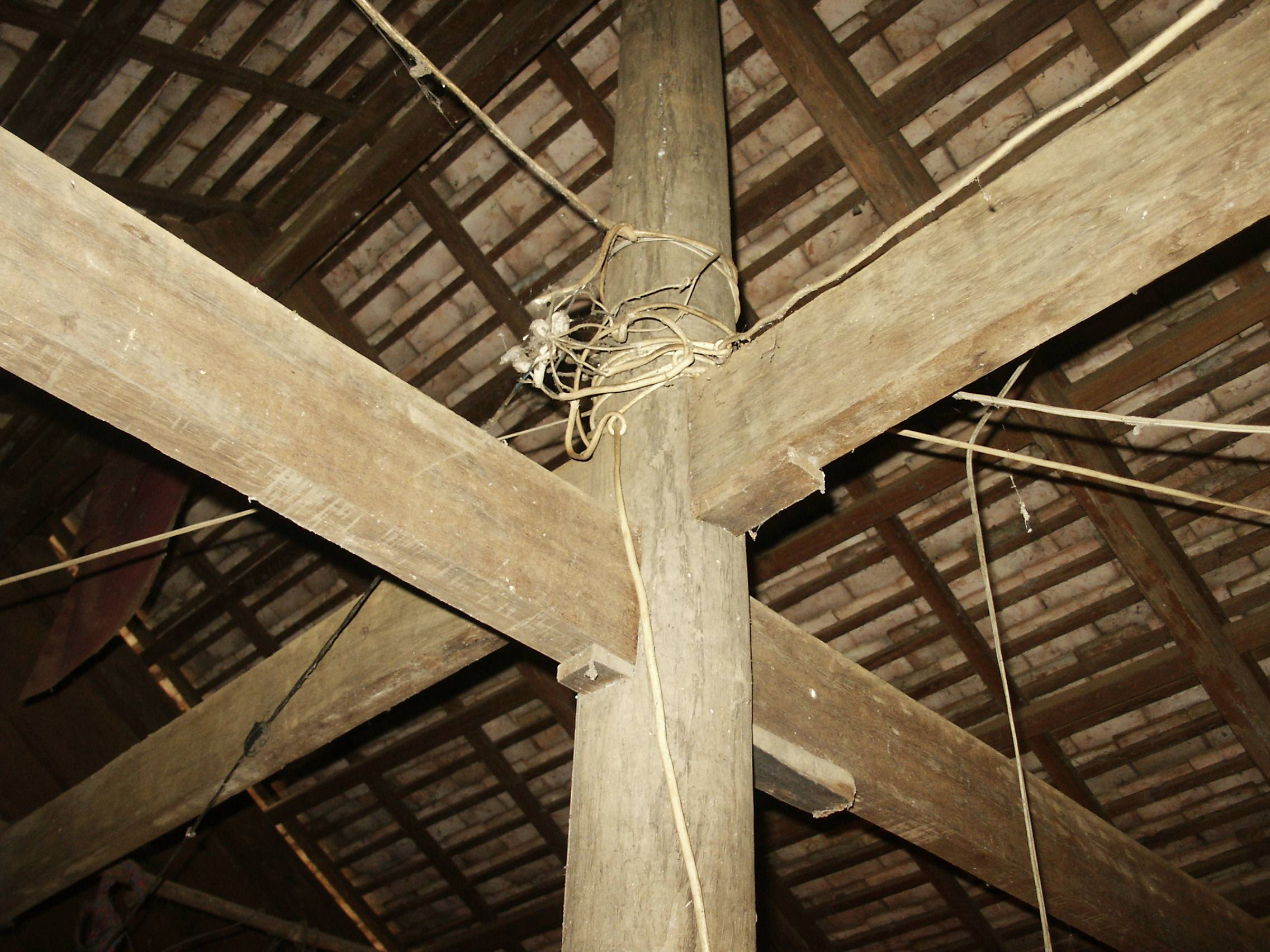
Piles

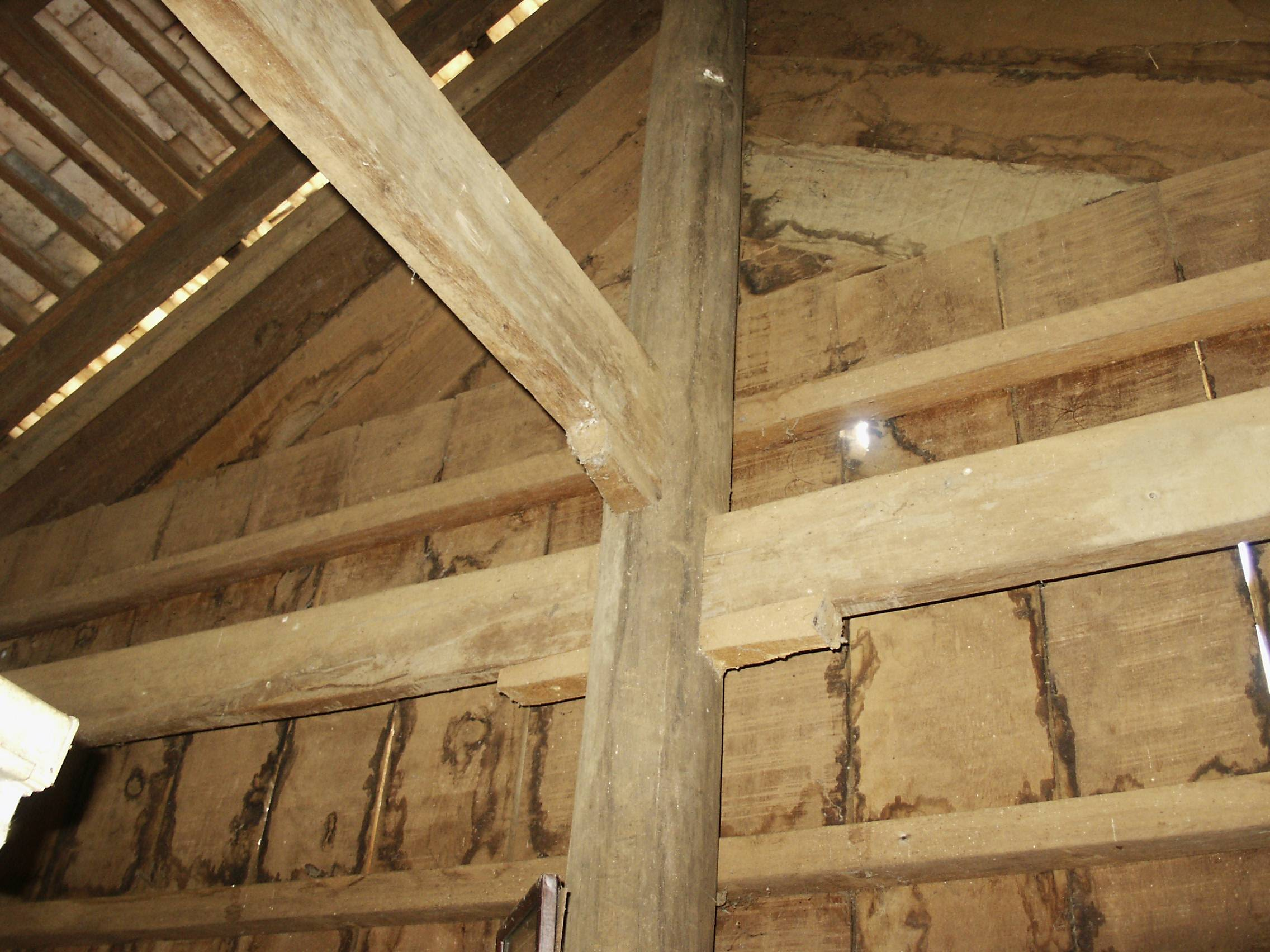
Piles

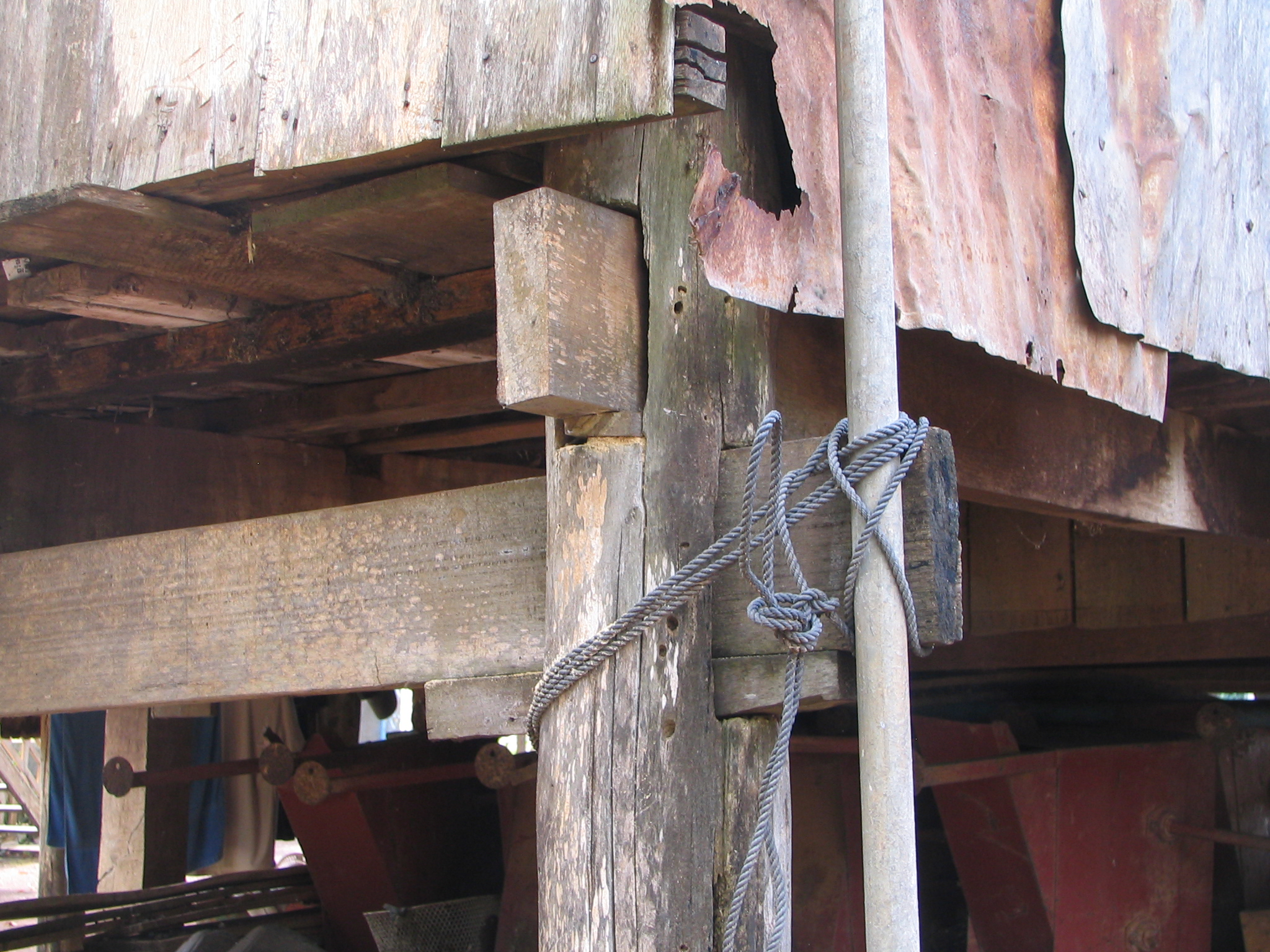
Joists

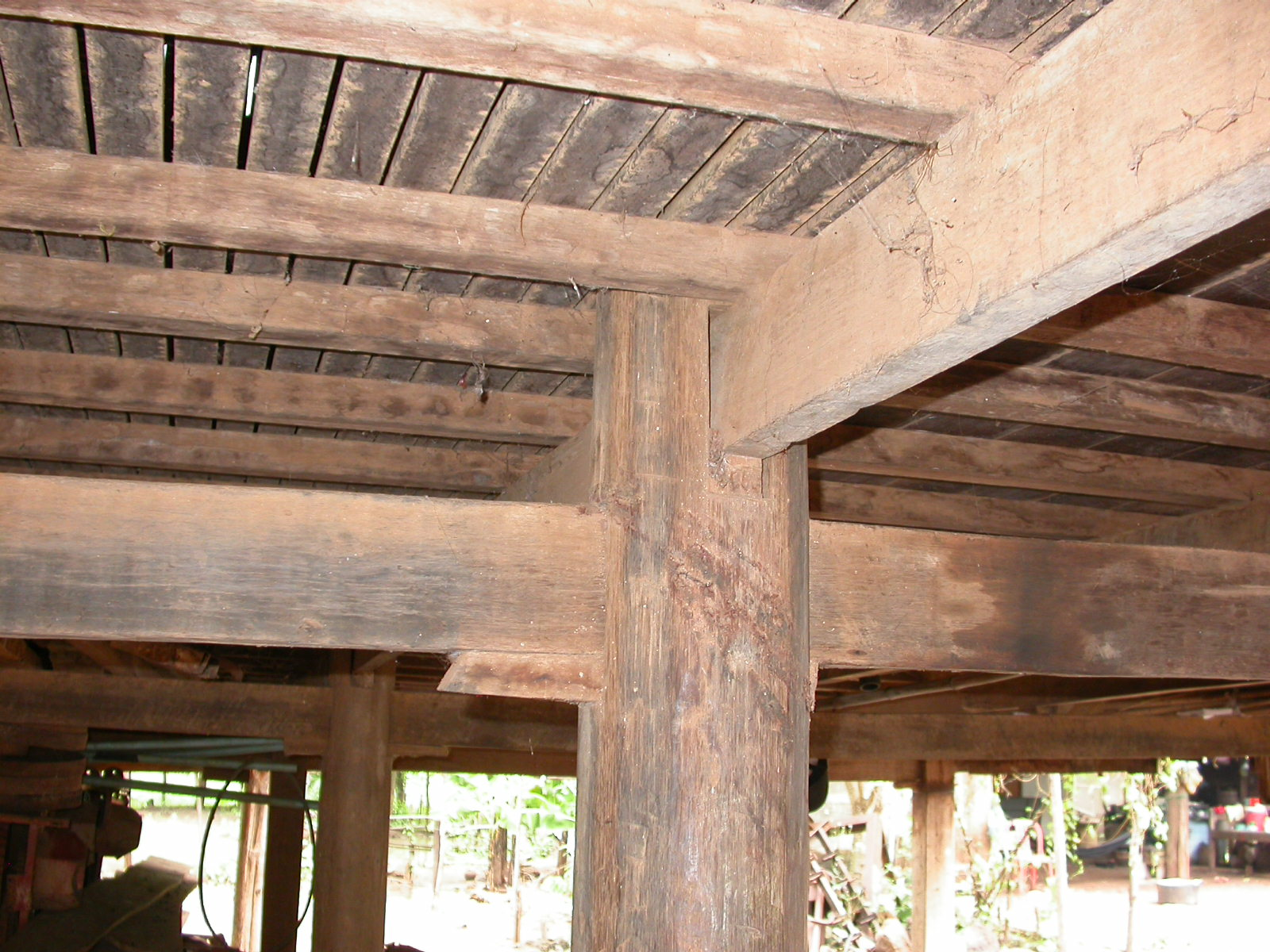
Joists

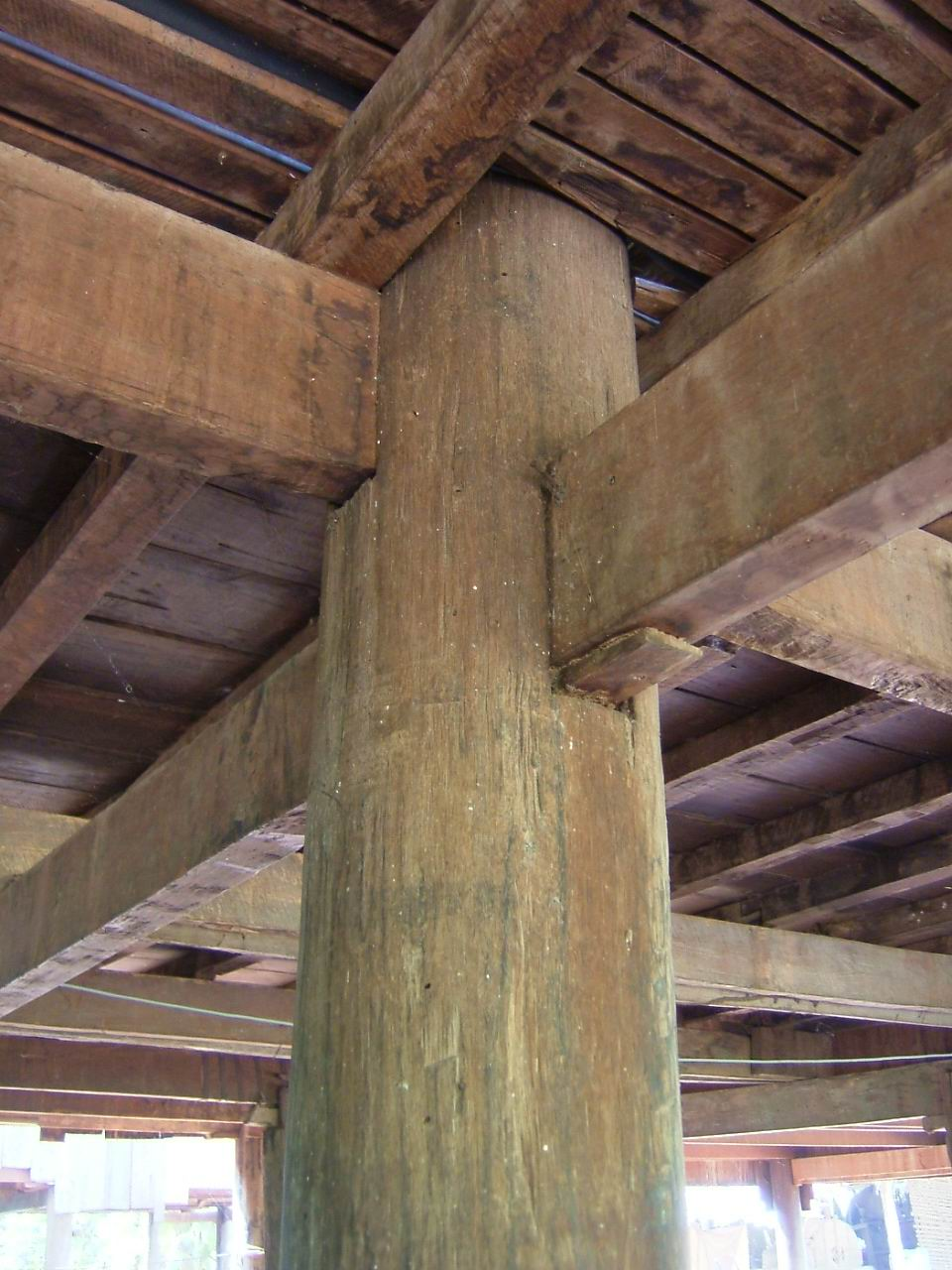
Joists

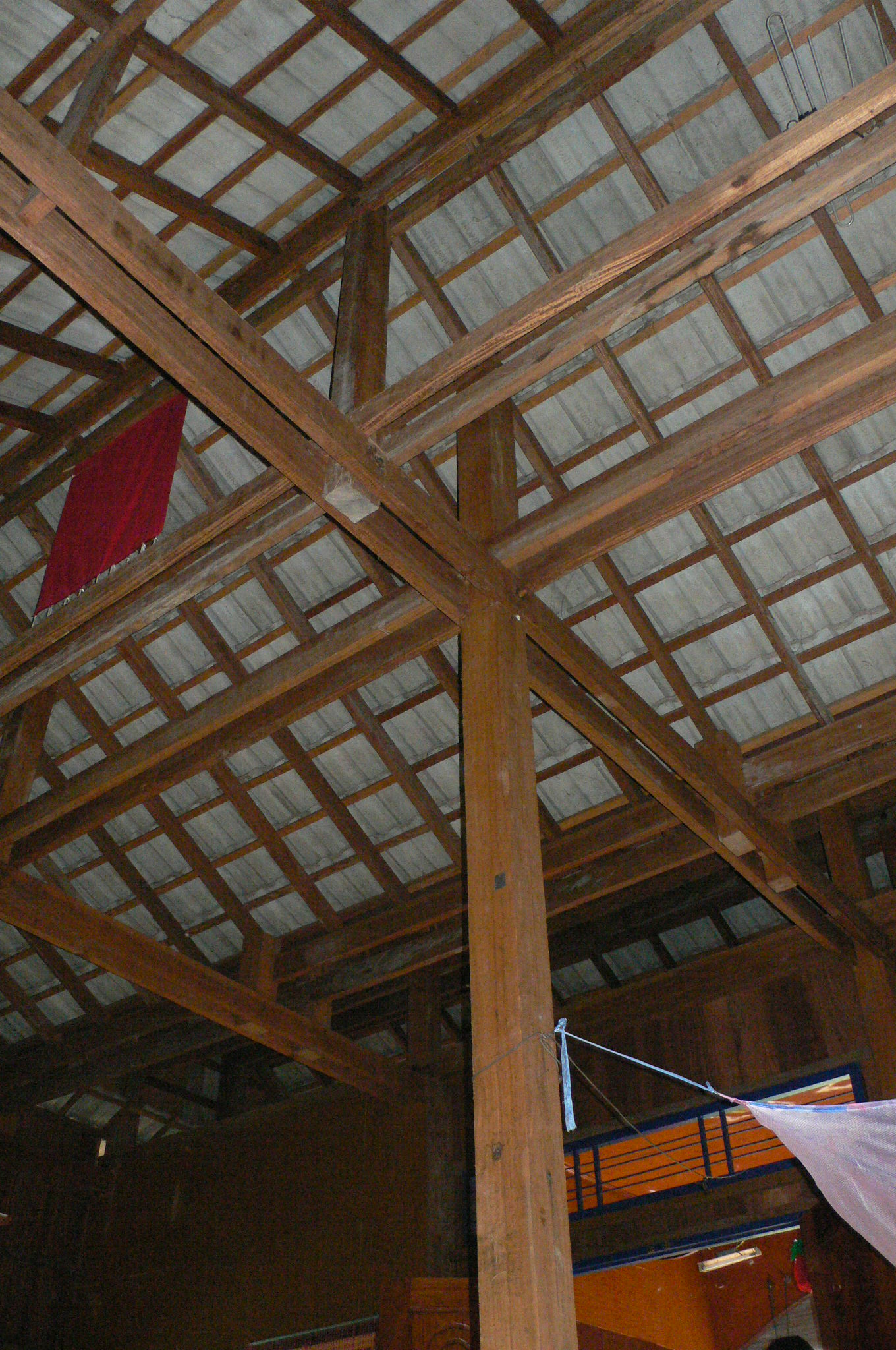
Roof

=== Assembly ===
Given the absence of diagonal bracing or shear walls, the stability of the structure depends on the joints. In traditional houses transverse and longitudinal rigidity is achieved by passing the horizontal joists through the piles, in close proximity, one above the other. Wedges are used to lock the joists in position. Nowadays this labour-intensive technique is no longer used and joists are no longer passed through the piles; instead, the joists consist of two identical beams that are placed to each side of the piles, to which they are fixed by screws or nails.

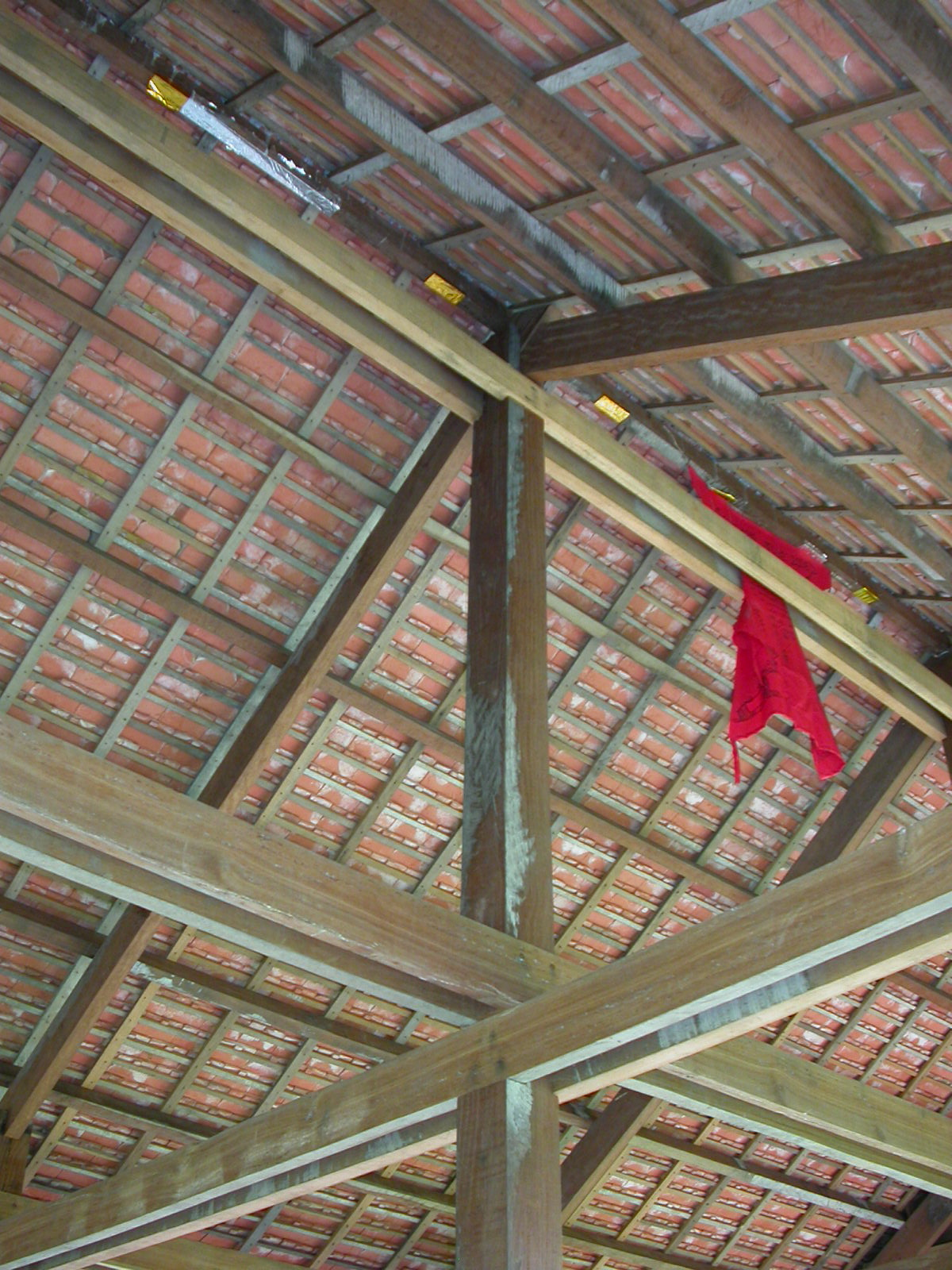

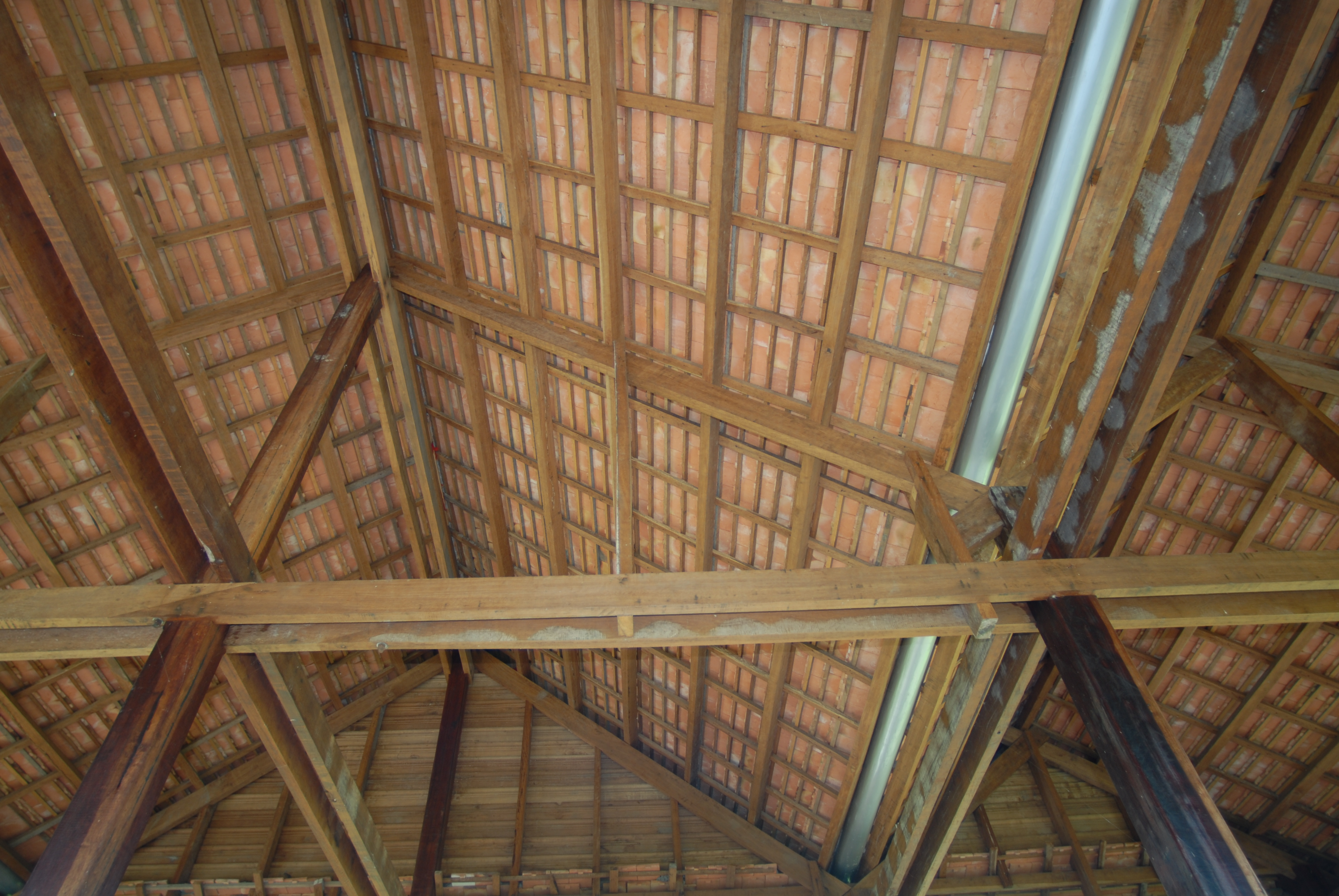

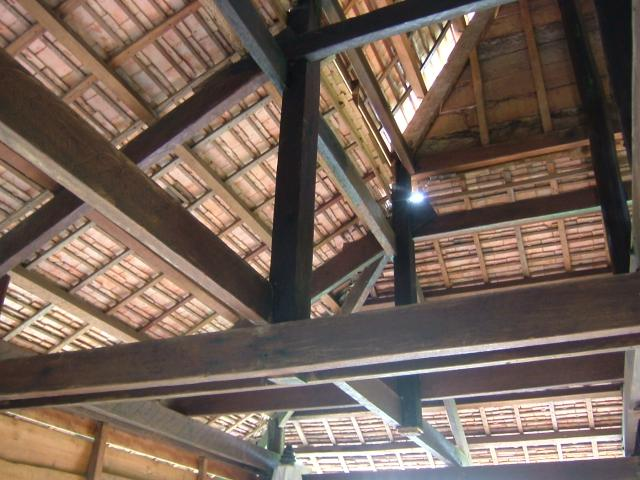

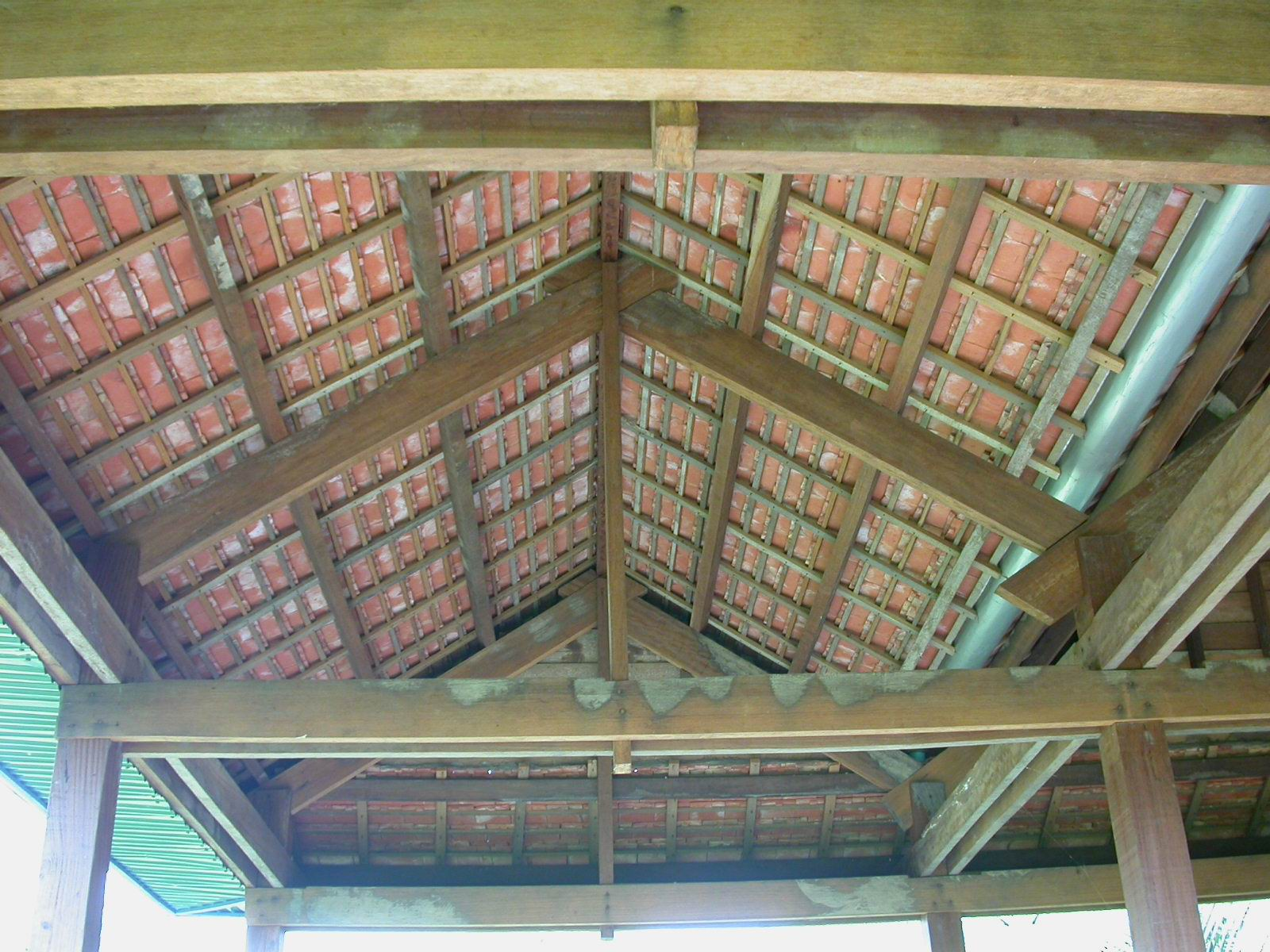

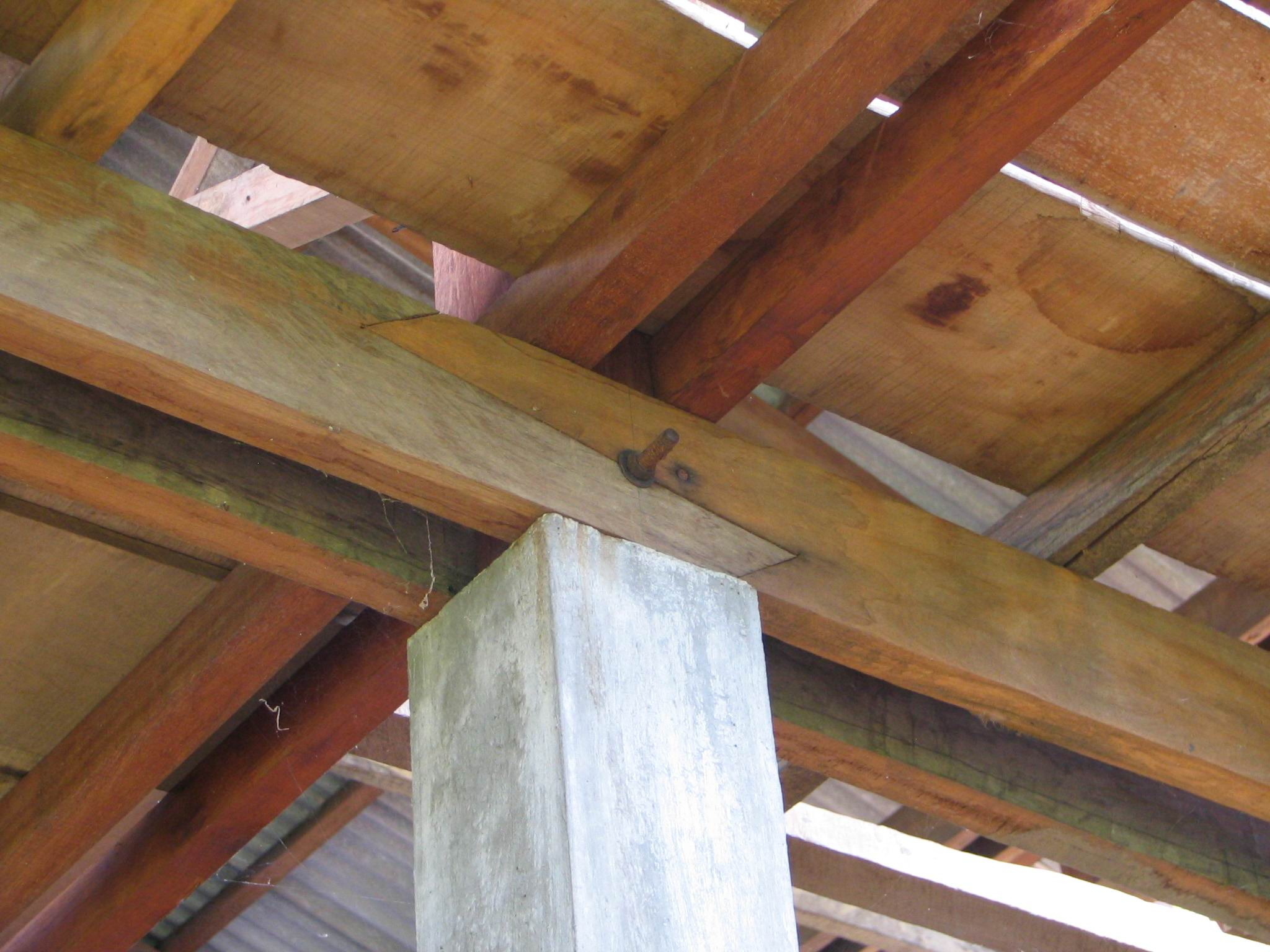

=== Wall cladding ===
Differences in the design are basically dependent on the financial means of a family and the materials available. Houses of simple farmers generally have walls made of palm leaf matting, the preparation of which is labour-intensive but does not rely on imported materials. The palm leaf matting is fixed directly to the structural framework. Fine bamboo struts are often used to anchor the matting. In more sophisticated houses wooden boards are used to clad the walls, aligned either horizontally or vertically. The horizontal version is fixed like weatherboarding, with the upper board overlapping the board below. Boards are butt jointed; in some cases, joints are covered with a strip of bamboo.

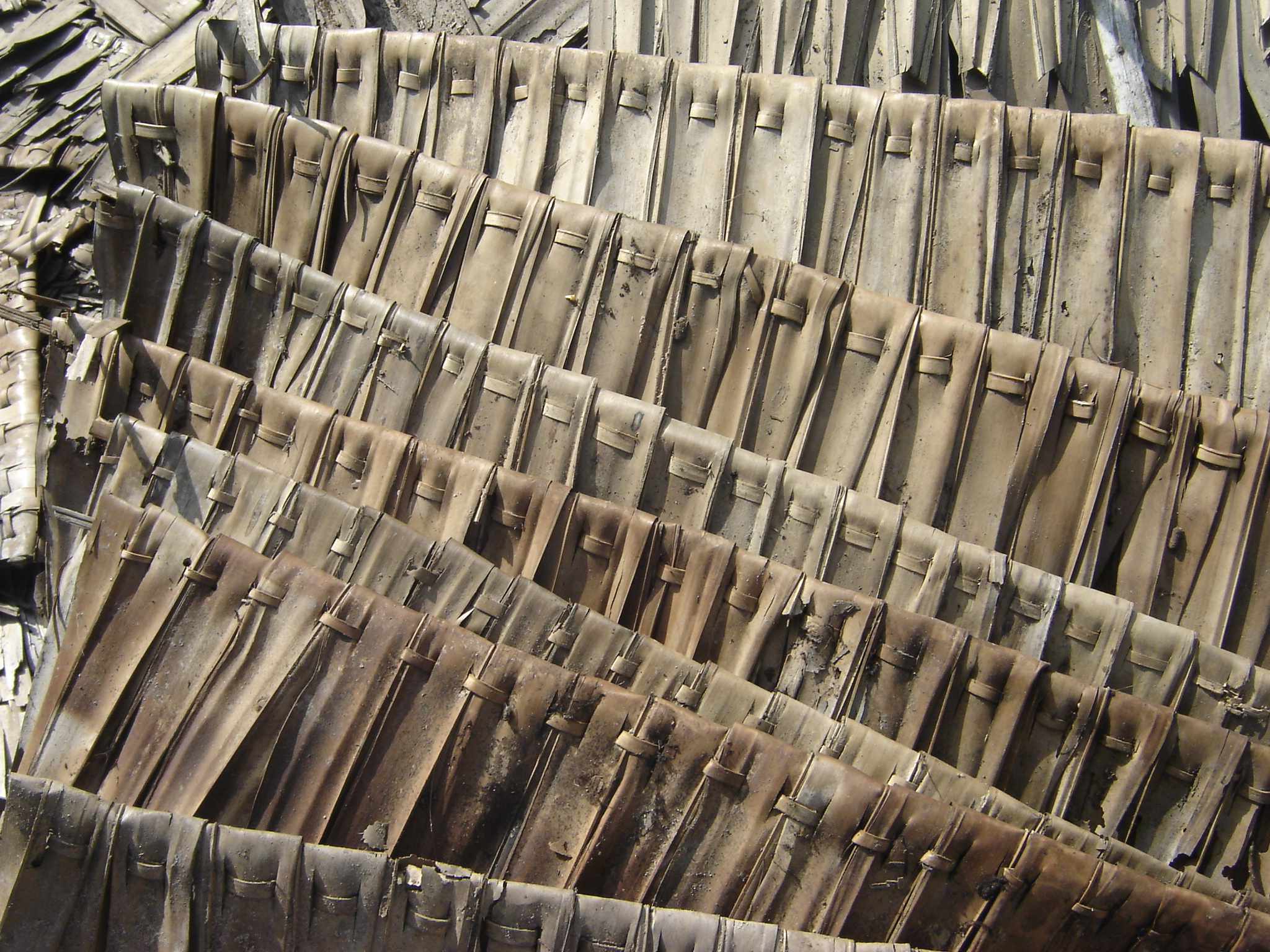

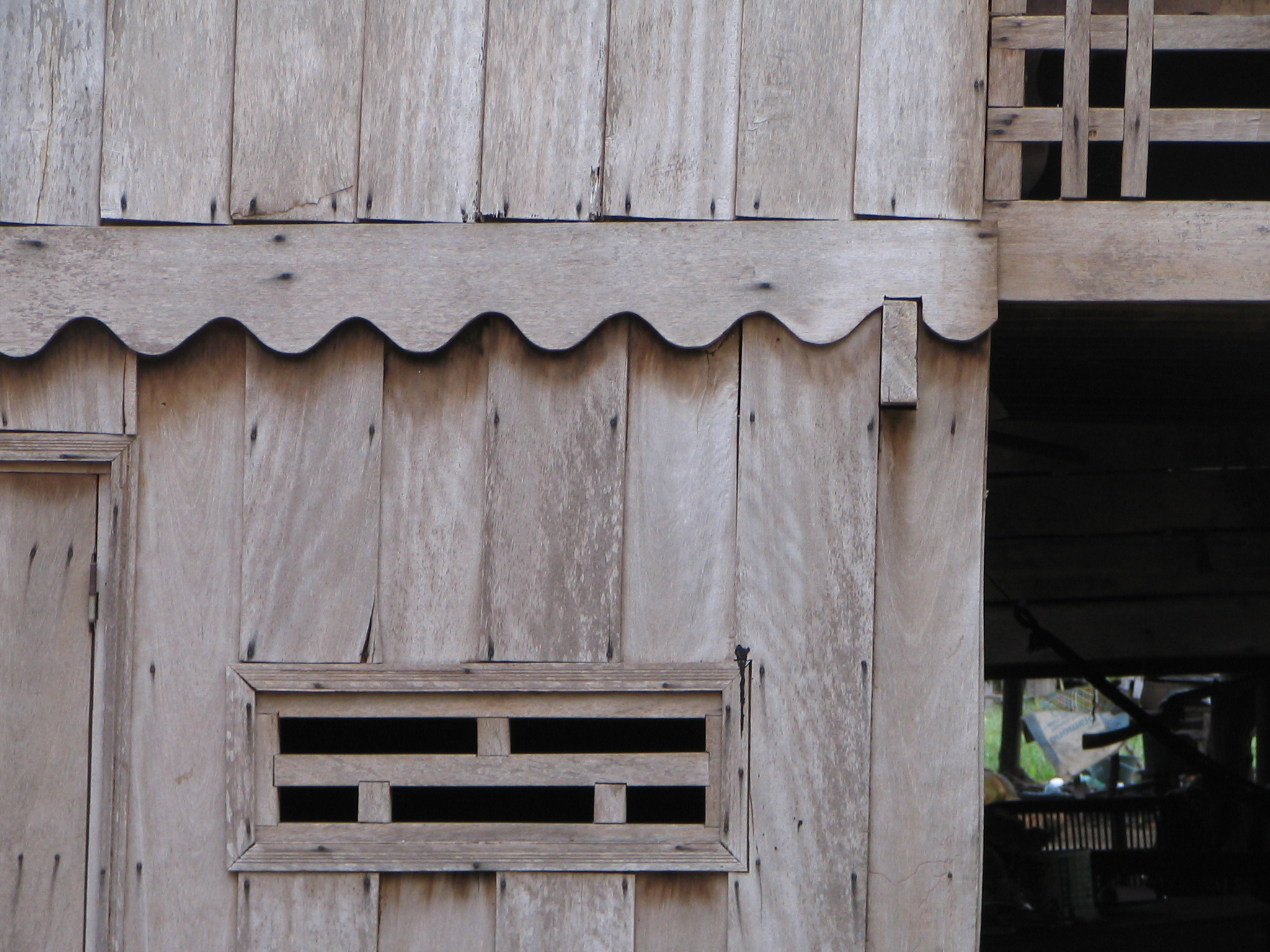

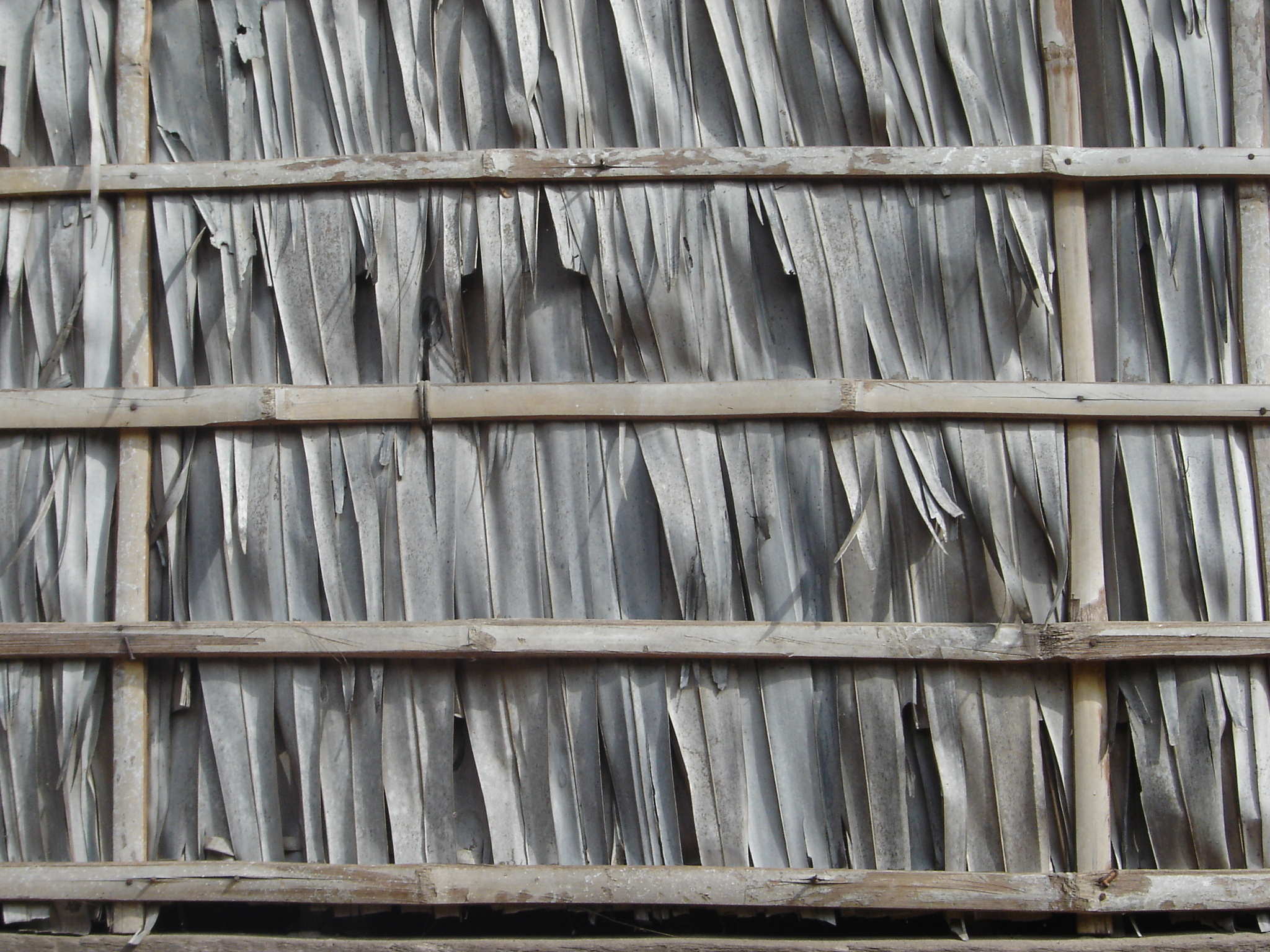

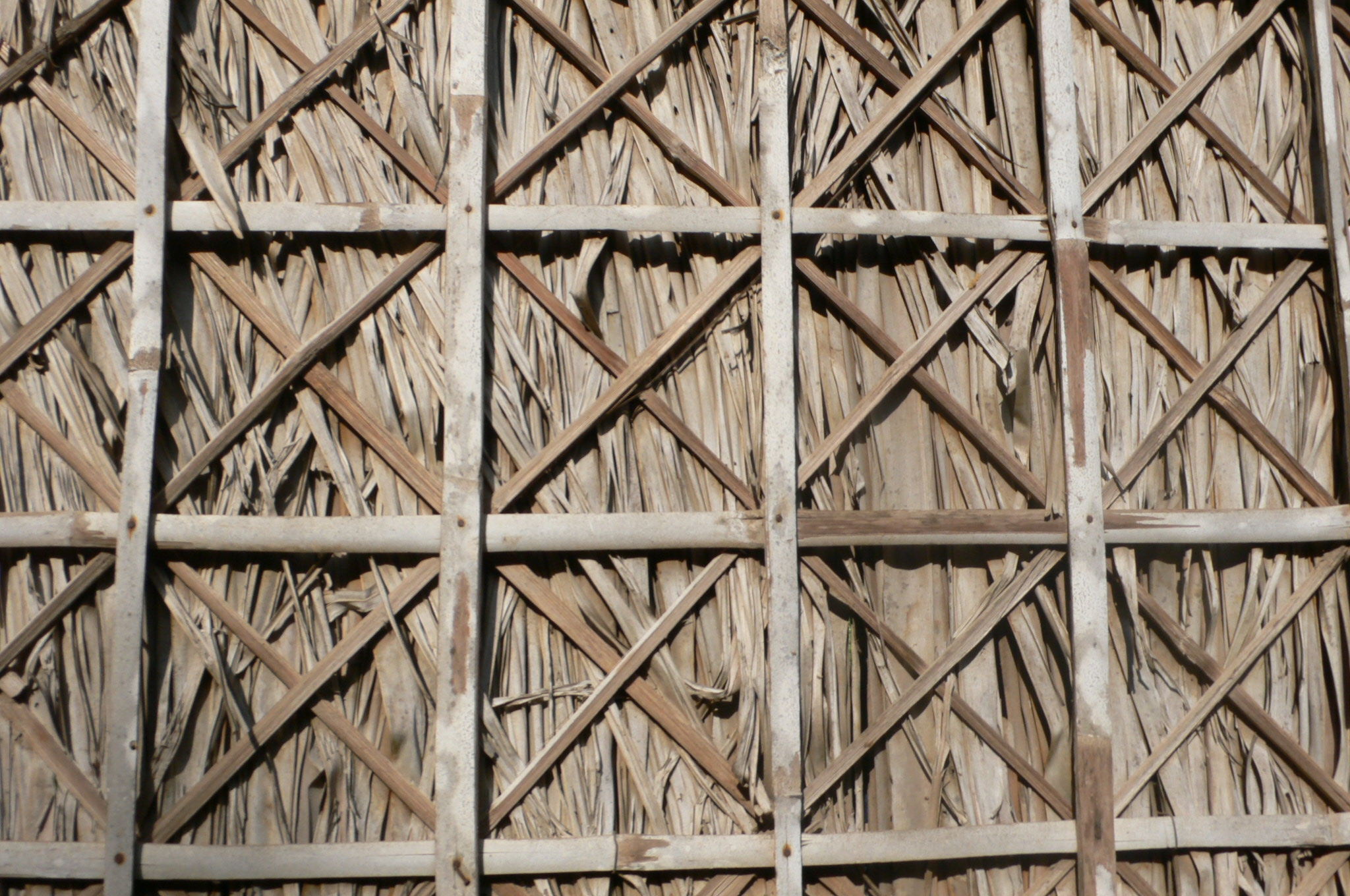

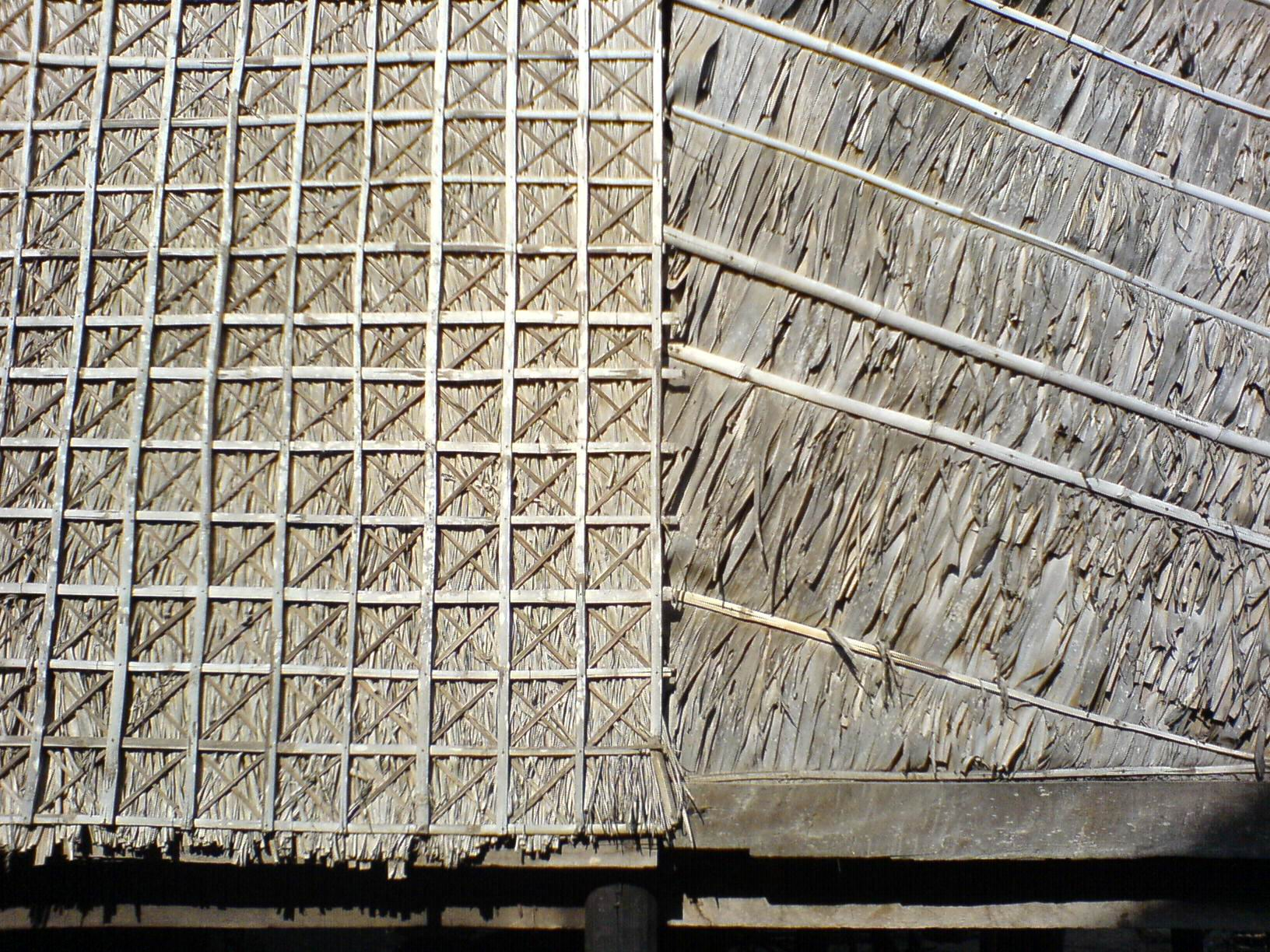

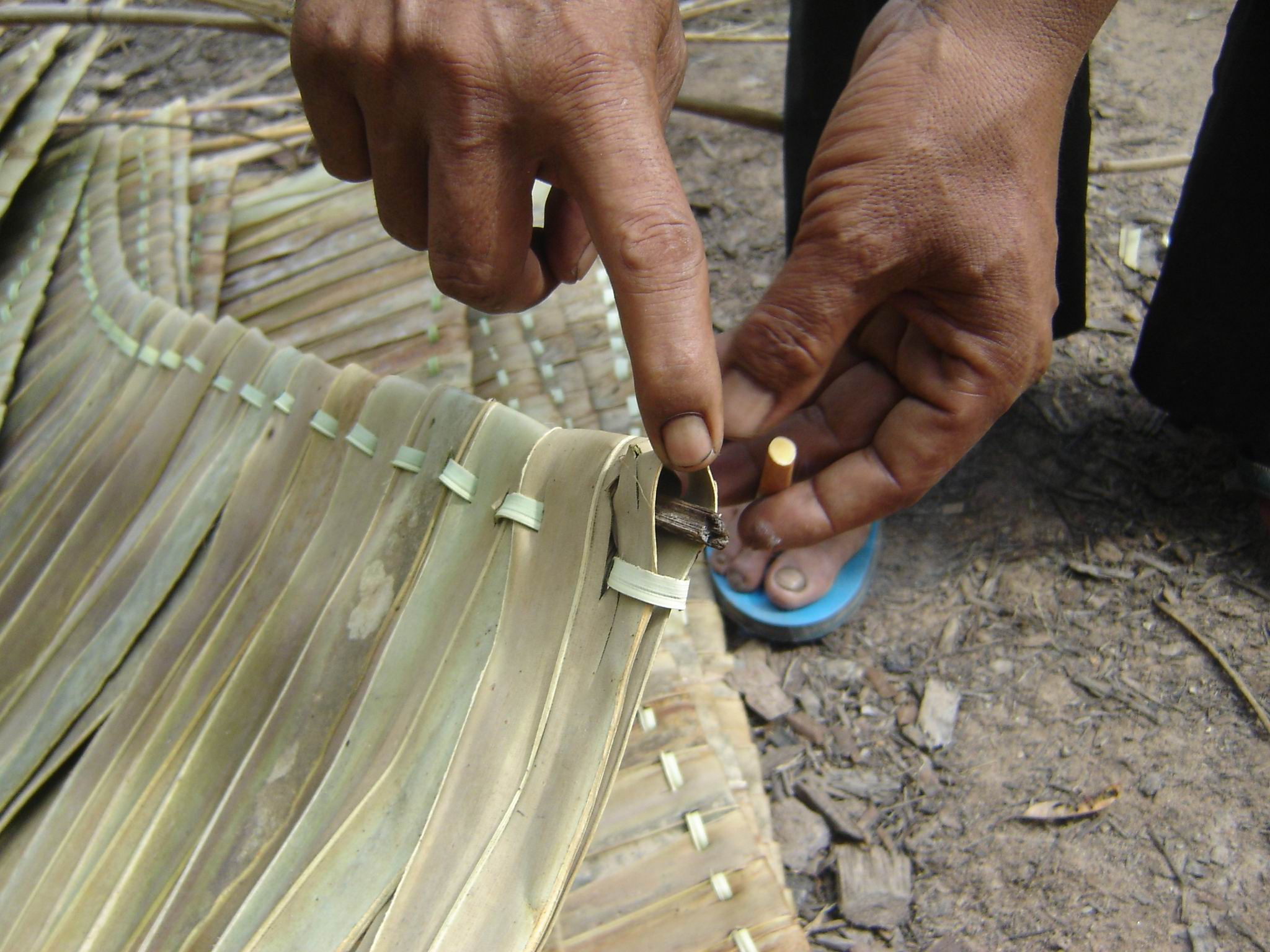

== Thermal comfort in a tropical, sub-tropical climate ==
Cambodia lies in the tropical zone, 10 to 13 degrees north of the equator. The climate is dominated by the monsoon cycle, with dry and wet seasons. November–February cool and dry, March–May hot and dry, June–August hot and wet, September–early November cool and wet.

=== Temperature and humidity recordings ===
Temperature and humidity recordings show that variations in temperature of the inner and outer surfaces no greater than ±1 °C. Thermal imaging confirms this, which leads to the conclusion that there is no noticeable difference in temperature outside or inside the house. Contrary to expectations, constant air circulation, which would have a cooling effect on surface temperatures, does not take place. However, the gap between the roof and the walls allows air to flow in and out, thereby preventing heat accumulation below the roof (see 6.3.).

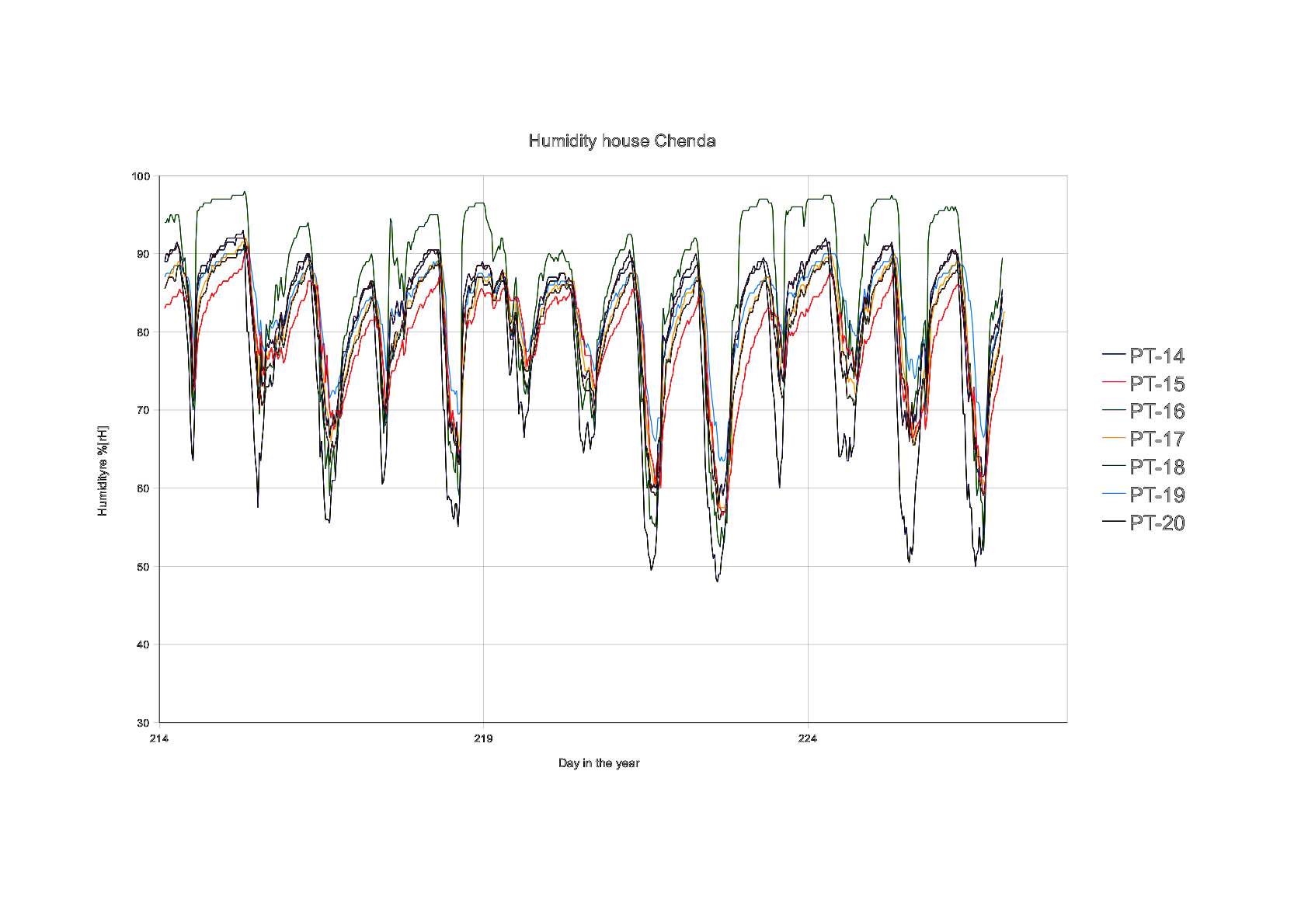

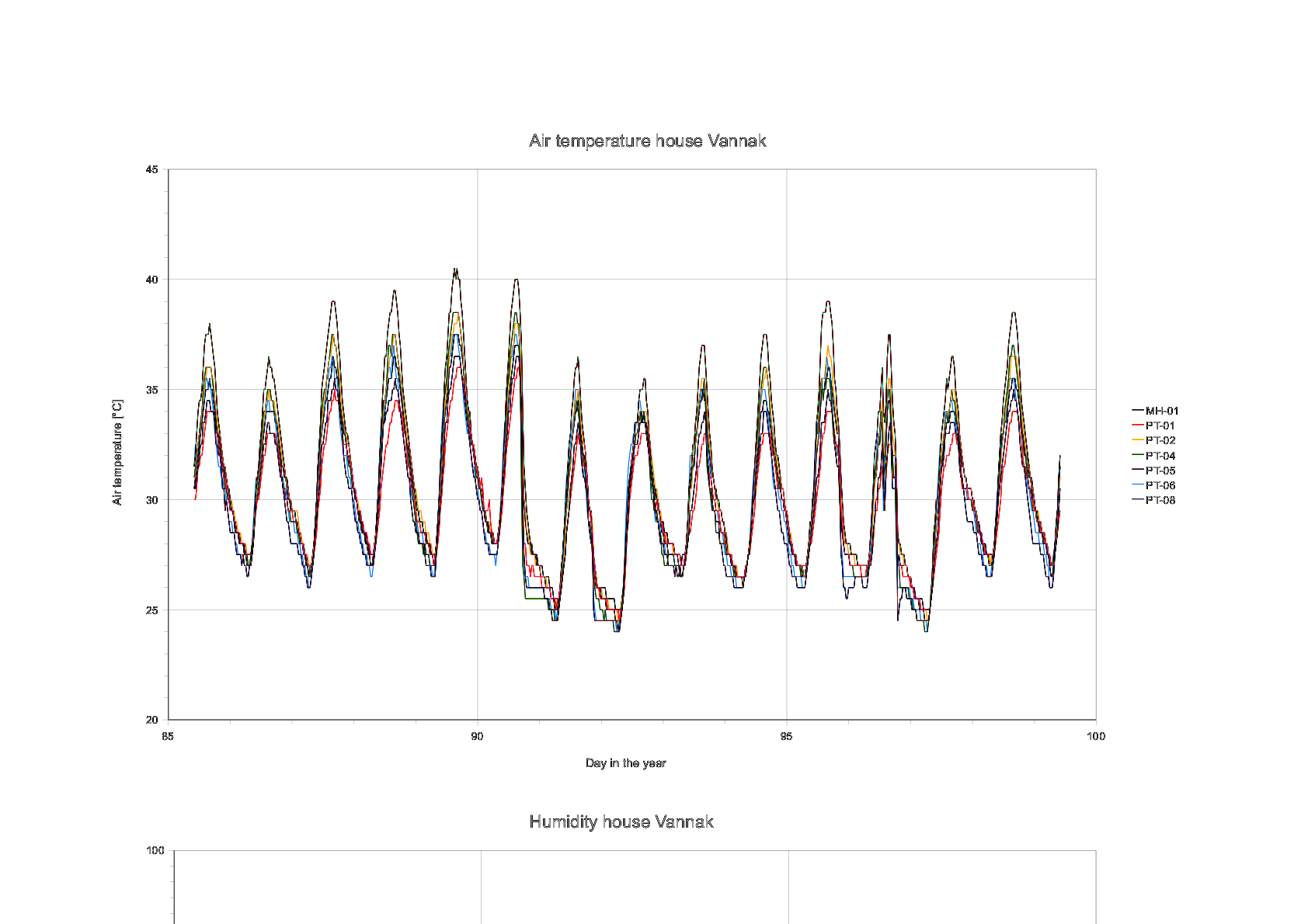

=== Thermal imaging ===
Infrared thermal imaging reveals that the lowest temperatures are found at ground level beneath the house. It can be said that the comfortable indoor climate is brought about by a combination of the 'umbrella effect' of the roof and natural ventilation. The roof shields the house against direct heat radiation, whilst the continuous opening between the roof and the top of the walls allows a constant flow of air in and out, which prevents an accumulation of warm air beneath the roof.

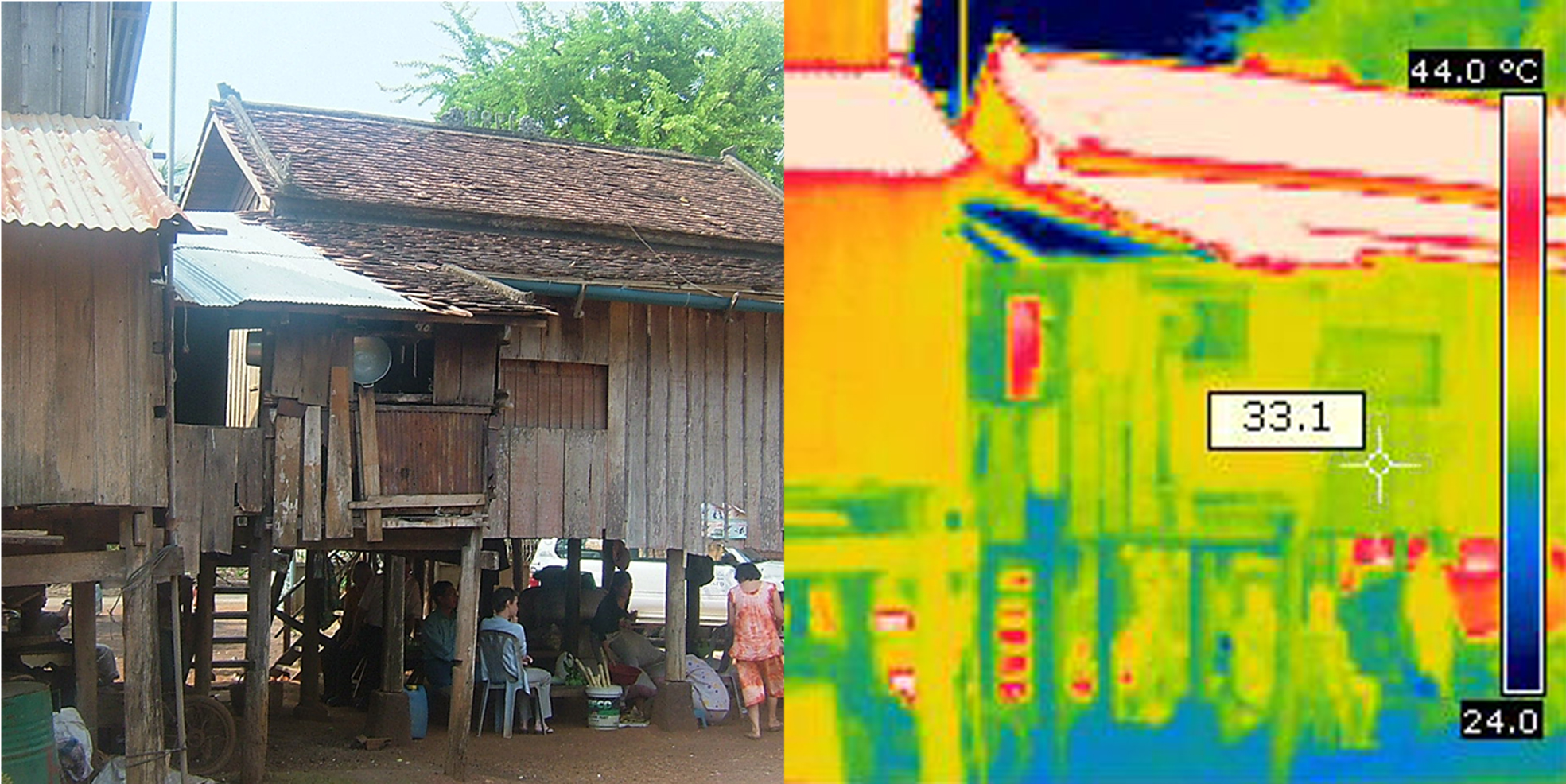

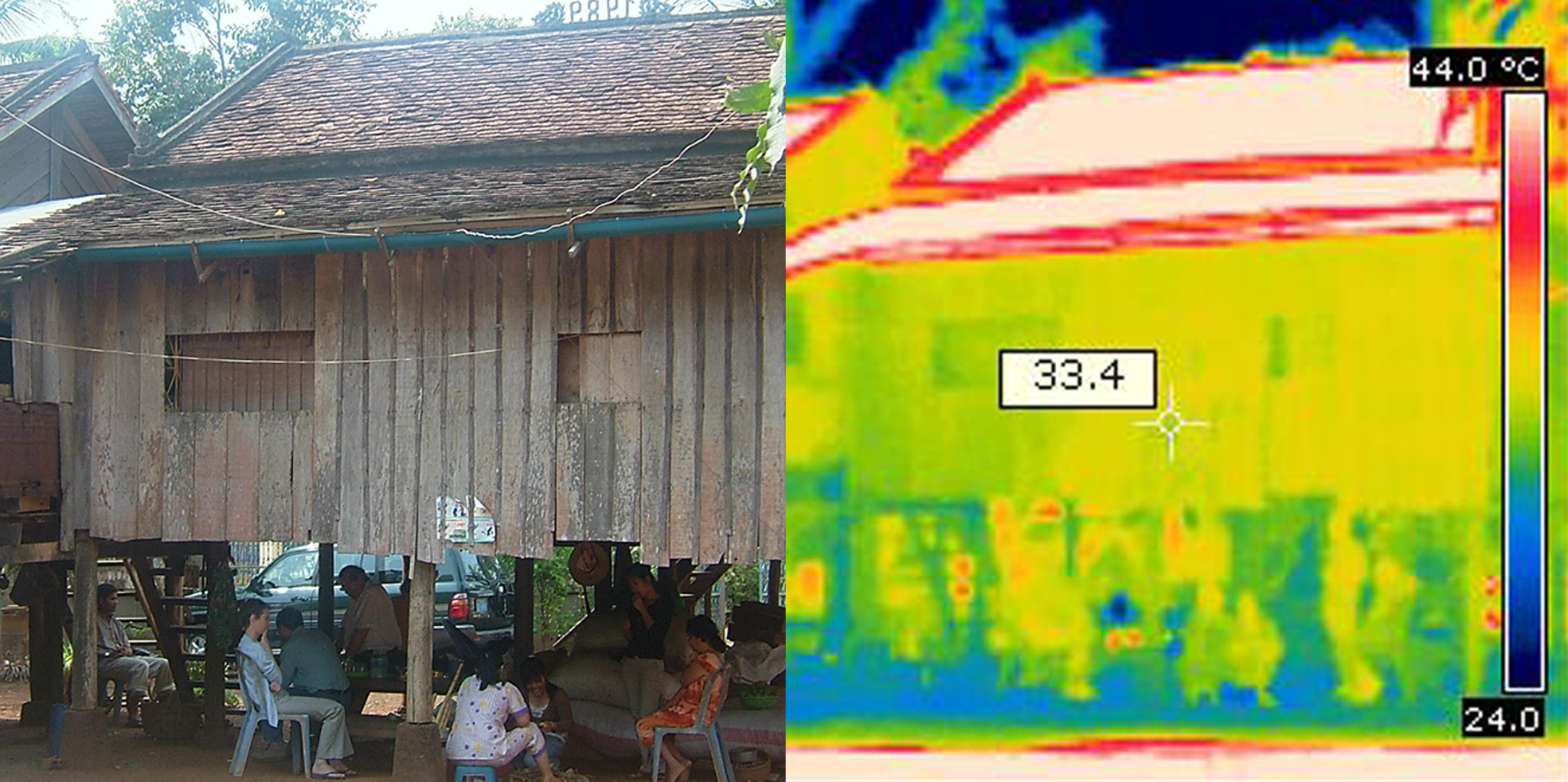

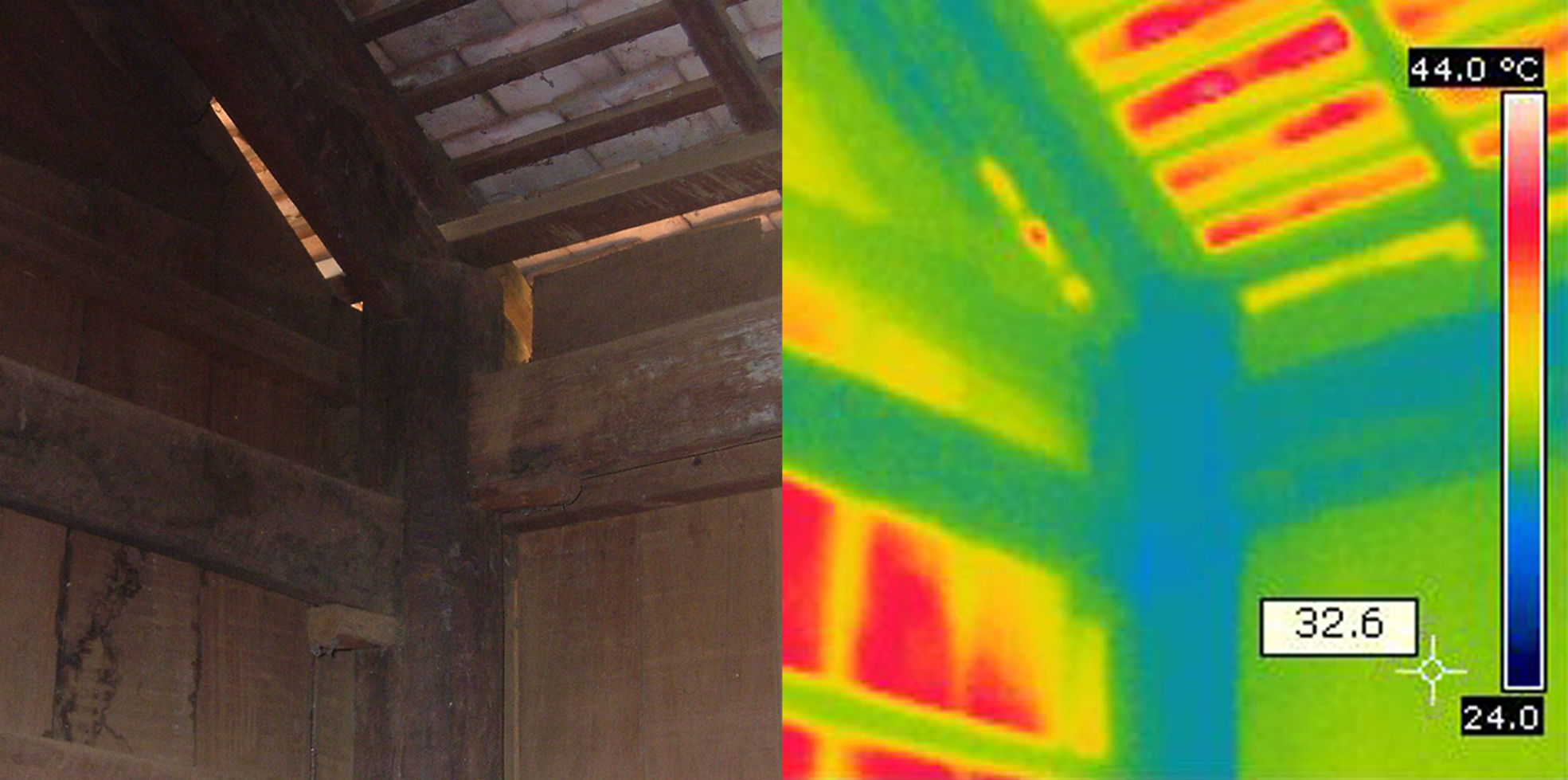

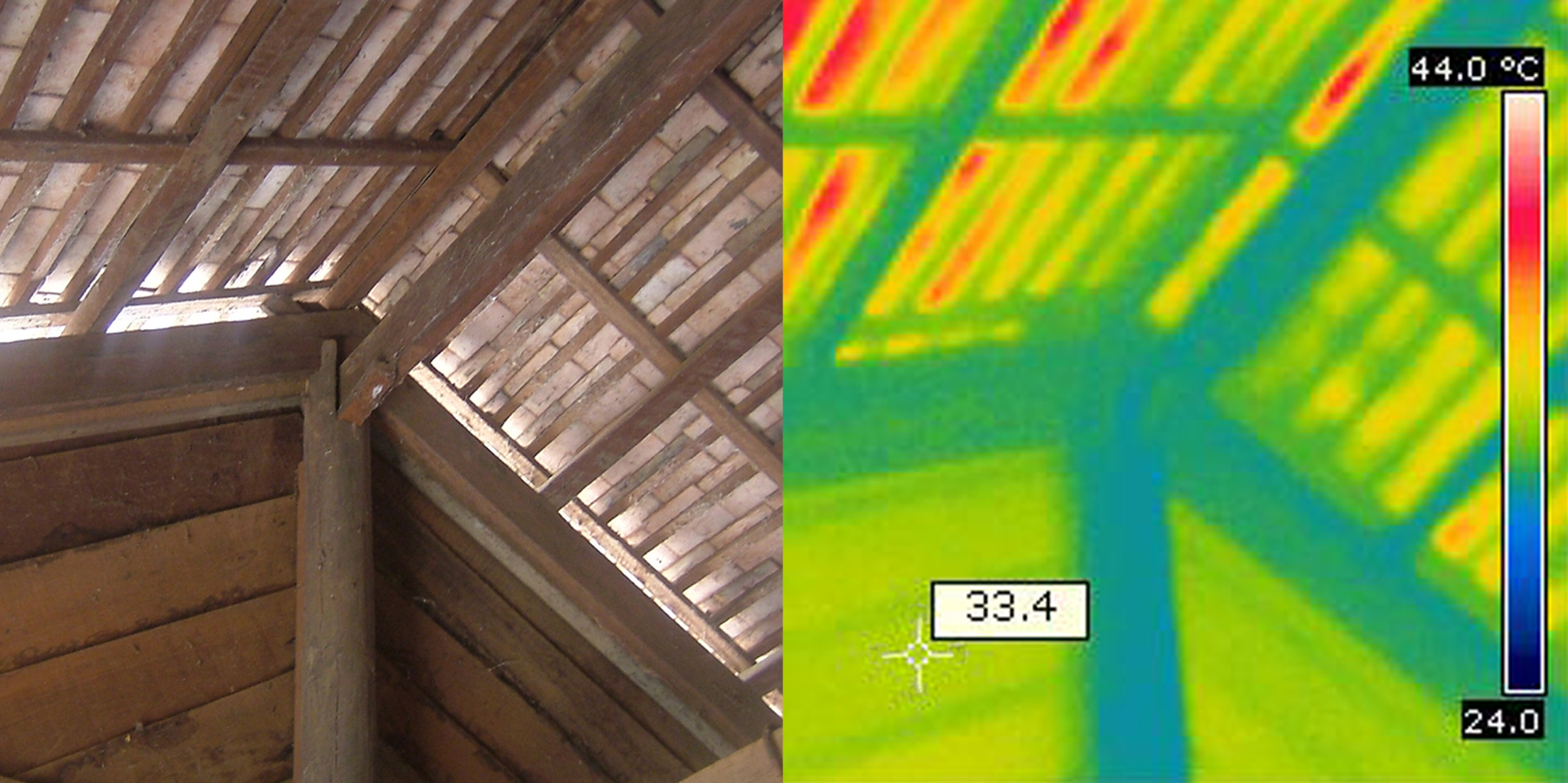

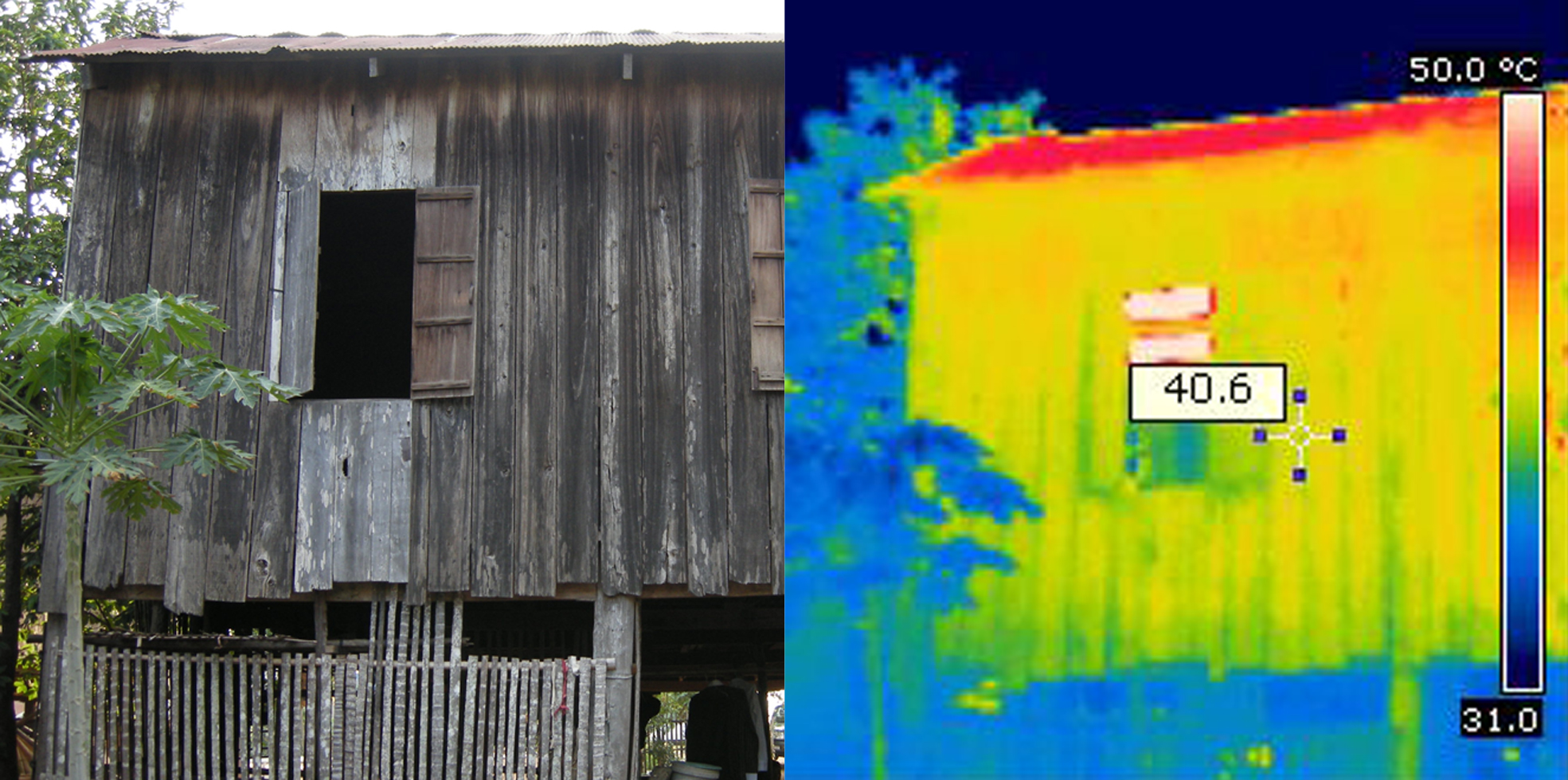

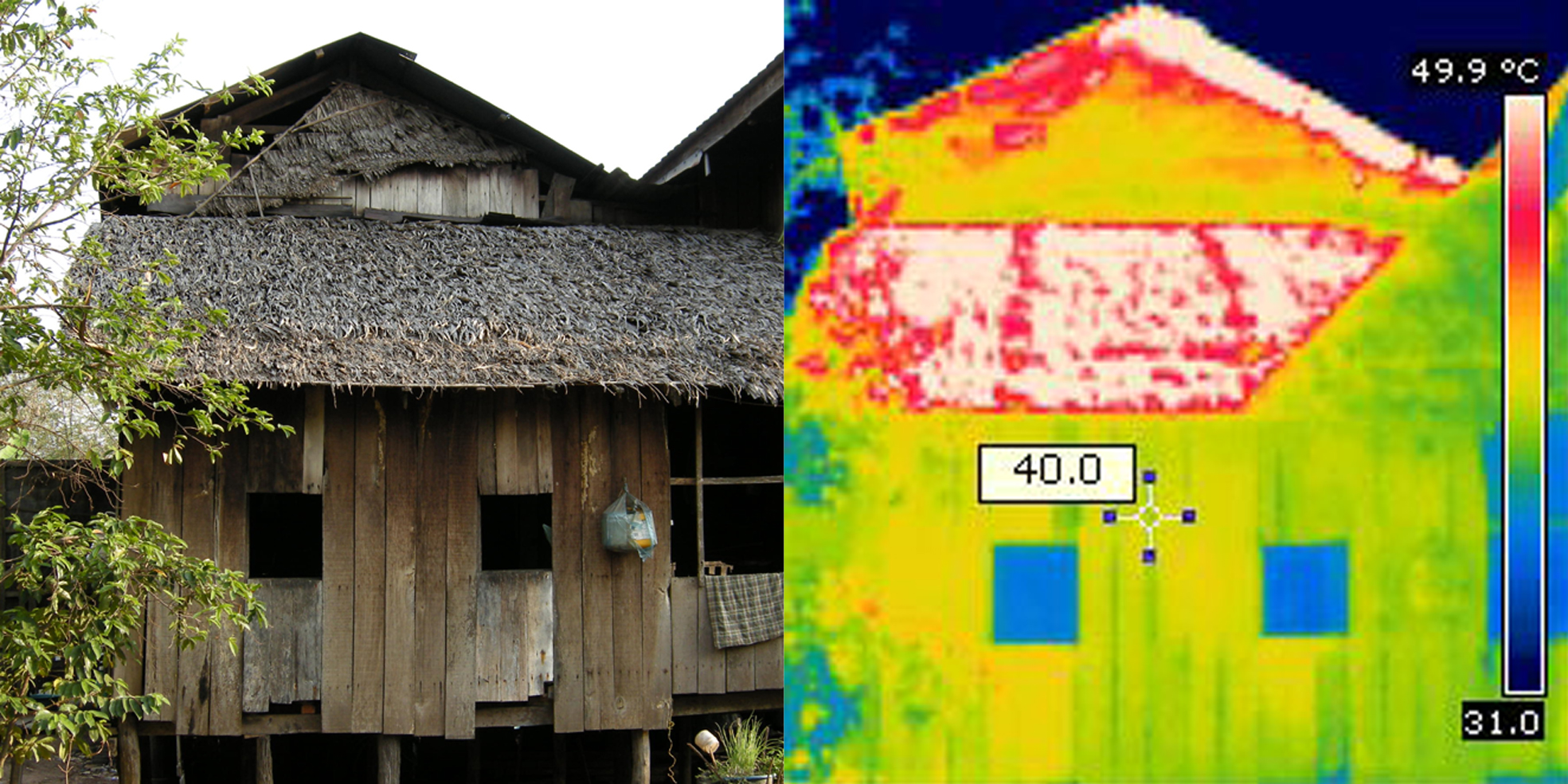

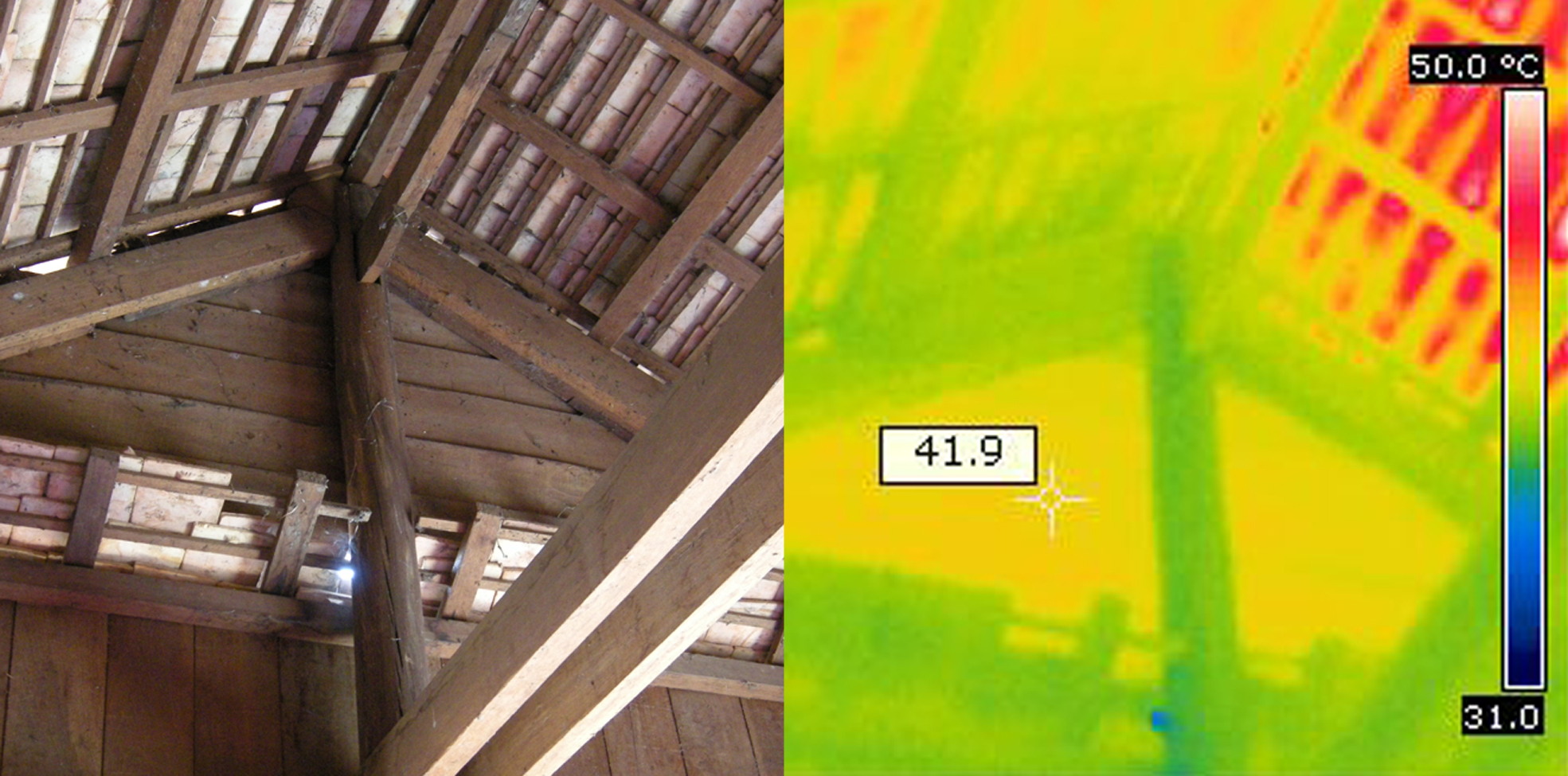

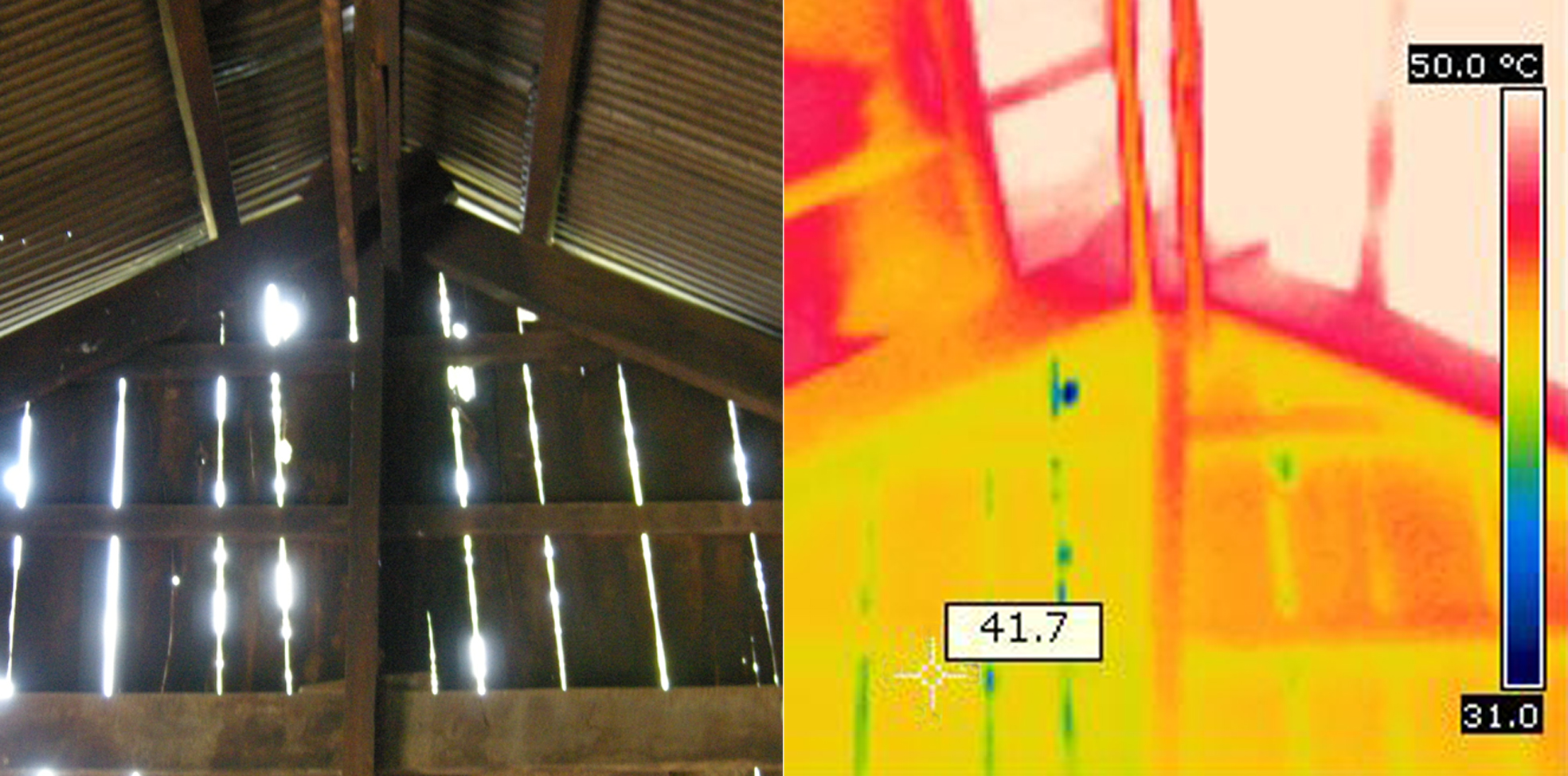

=== Air flow study using smoke as tracer ===
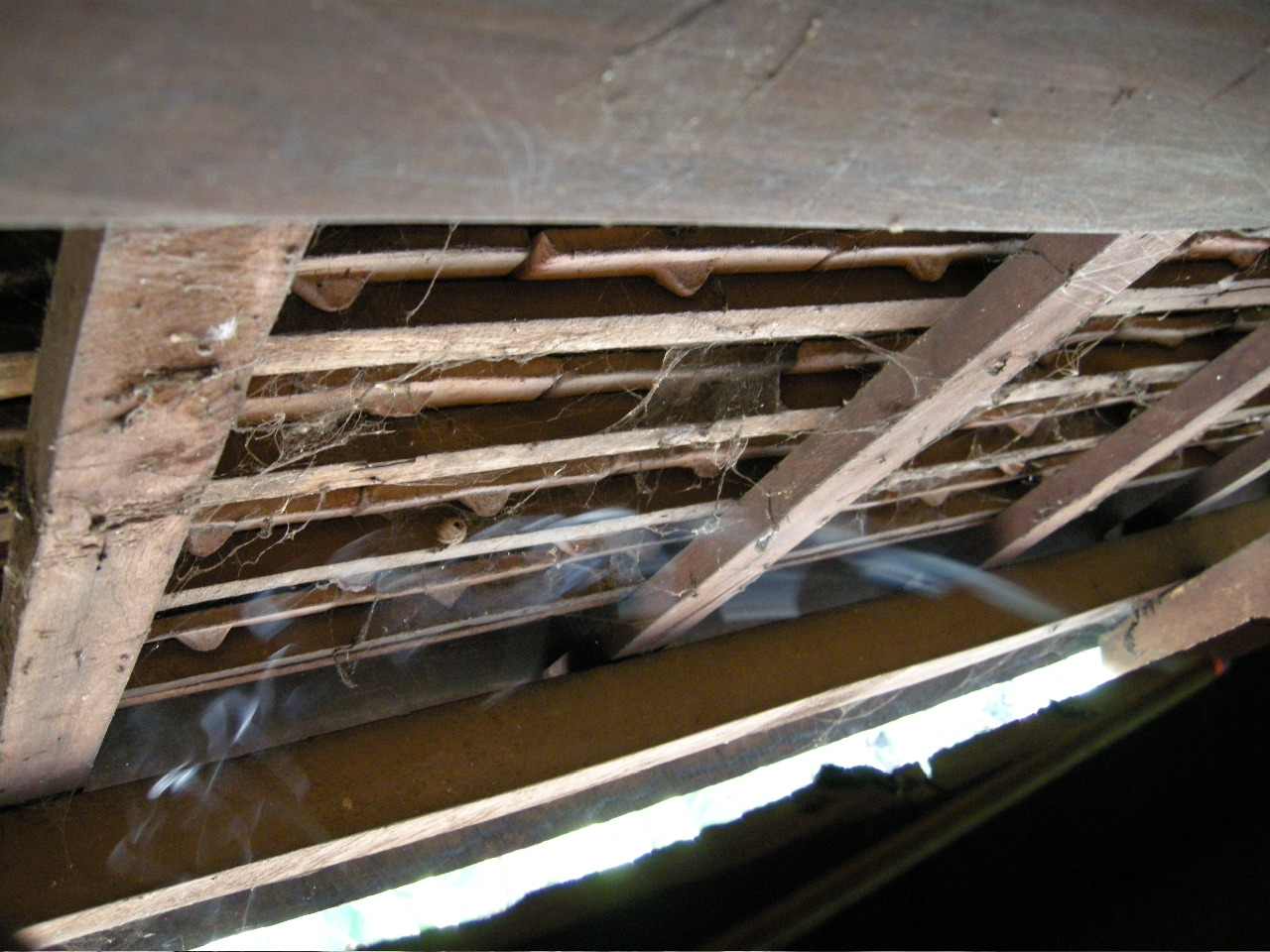

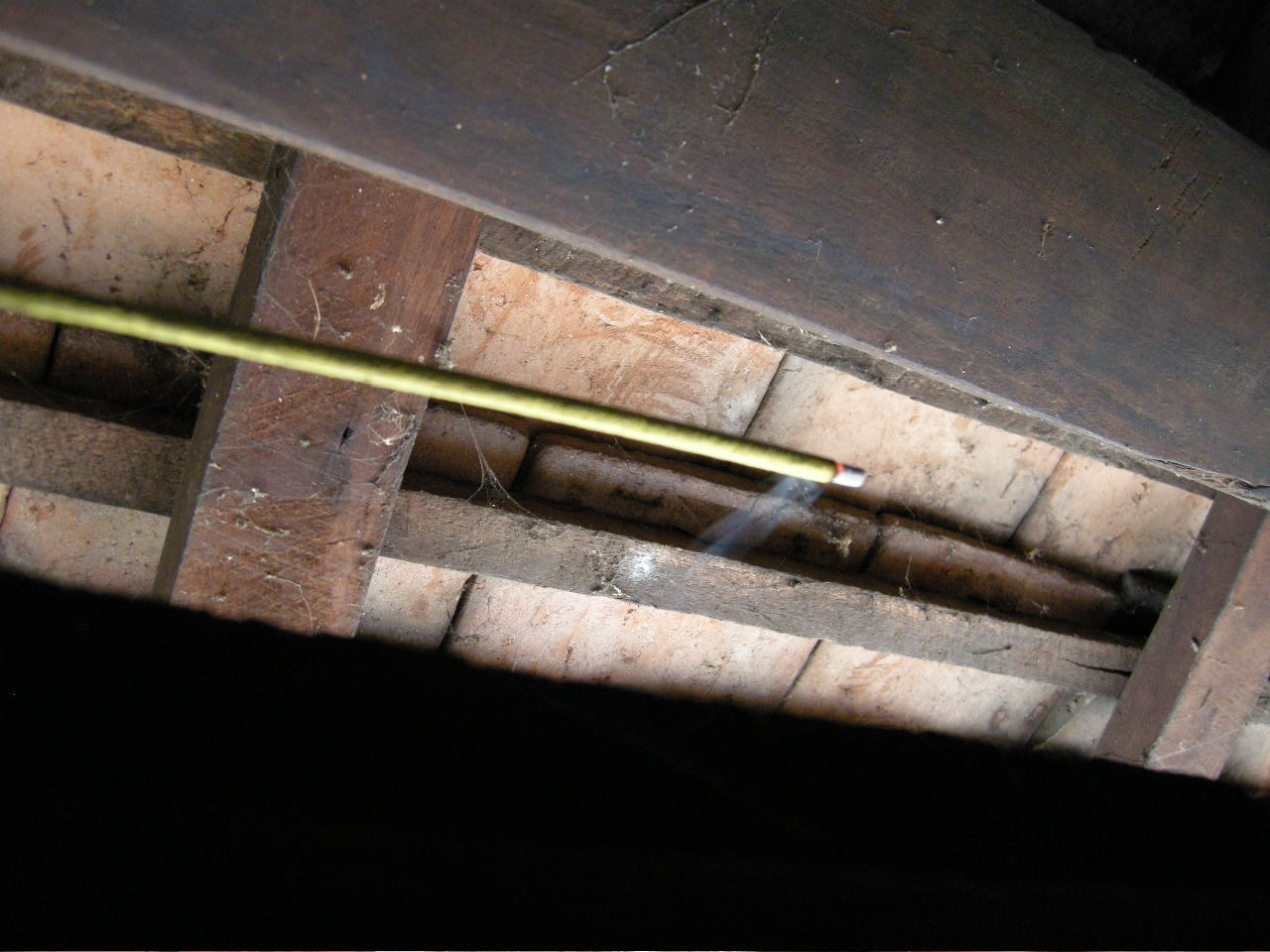

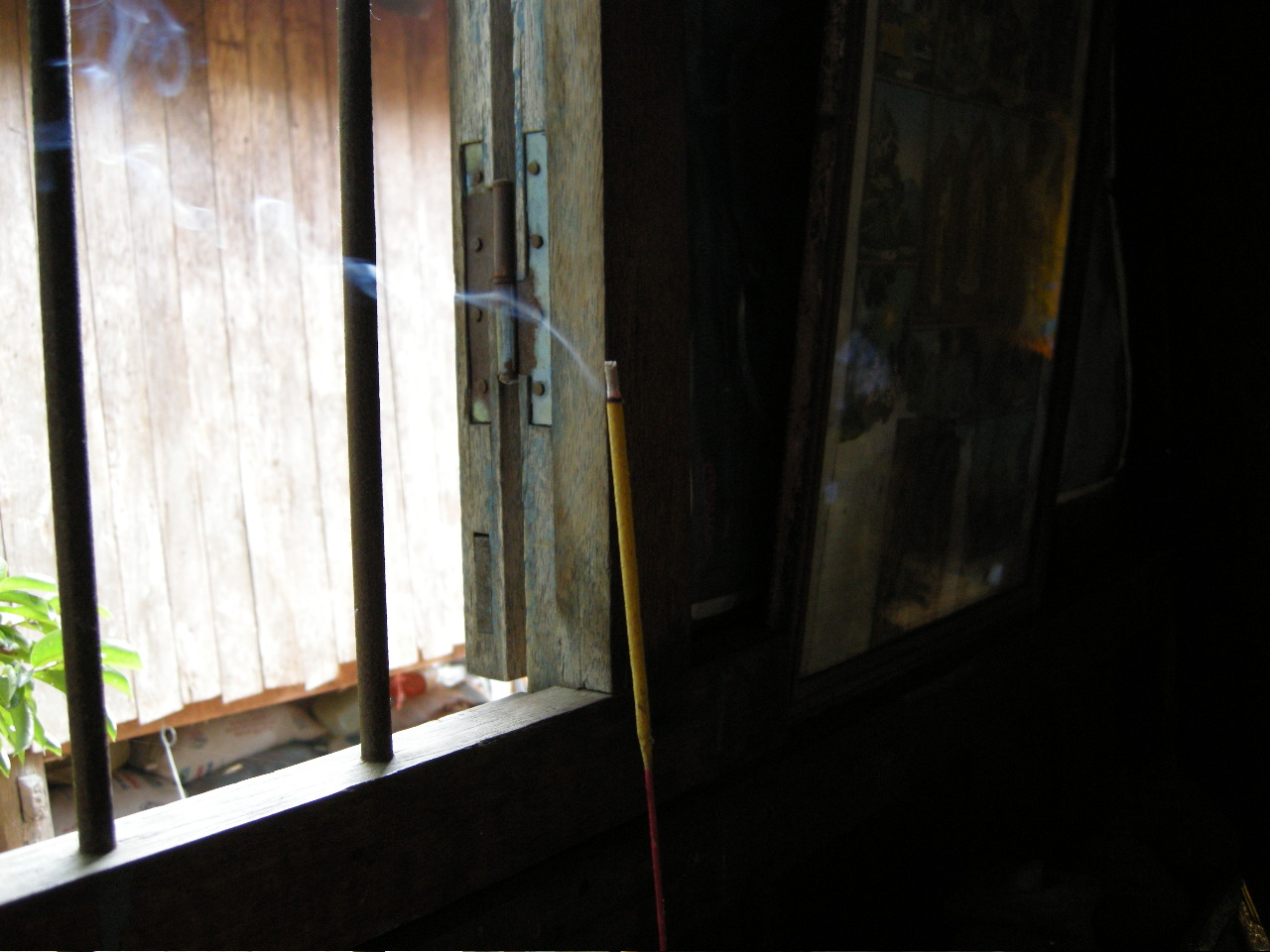

=== Conclusion ===
Despite indoor temperatures of 36 °C and up to 80% relative humidity, and though there is no electric air-conditioning, a comfortable, draught-free environment is maintained. This is possible thanks to the 'umbrella effect' of the roof.

== Primeval forest settlement north of Siem Reap ==
Size of settlement: 50 – 80 houses, of which the oldest is approximately 120 years old; typical two-storey Khmer houses on piles.

Village structure: several open areas, and one central, communal area (measuring about 2,500 m2) with a well. The inhabitants and their livestock live communally beneath the same roof. Animals are left to roam freely throughout the day, with no fencing. Clear division of space: the area between houses forms alleyways of variable width. Day-to-day family life takes place on the ground level; on the upper floor individual rooms, partitioned off by cloth hangings, serve as sleeping areas and – if there is one – a place to watch TV.

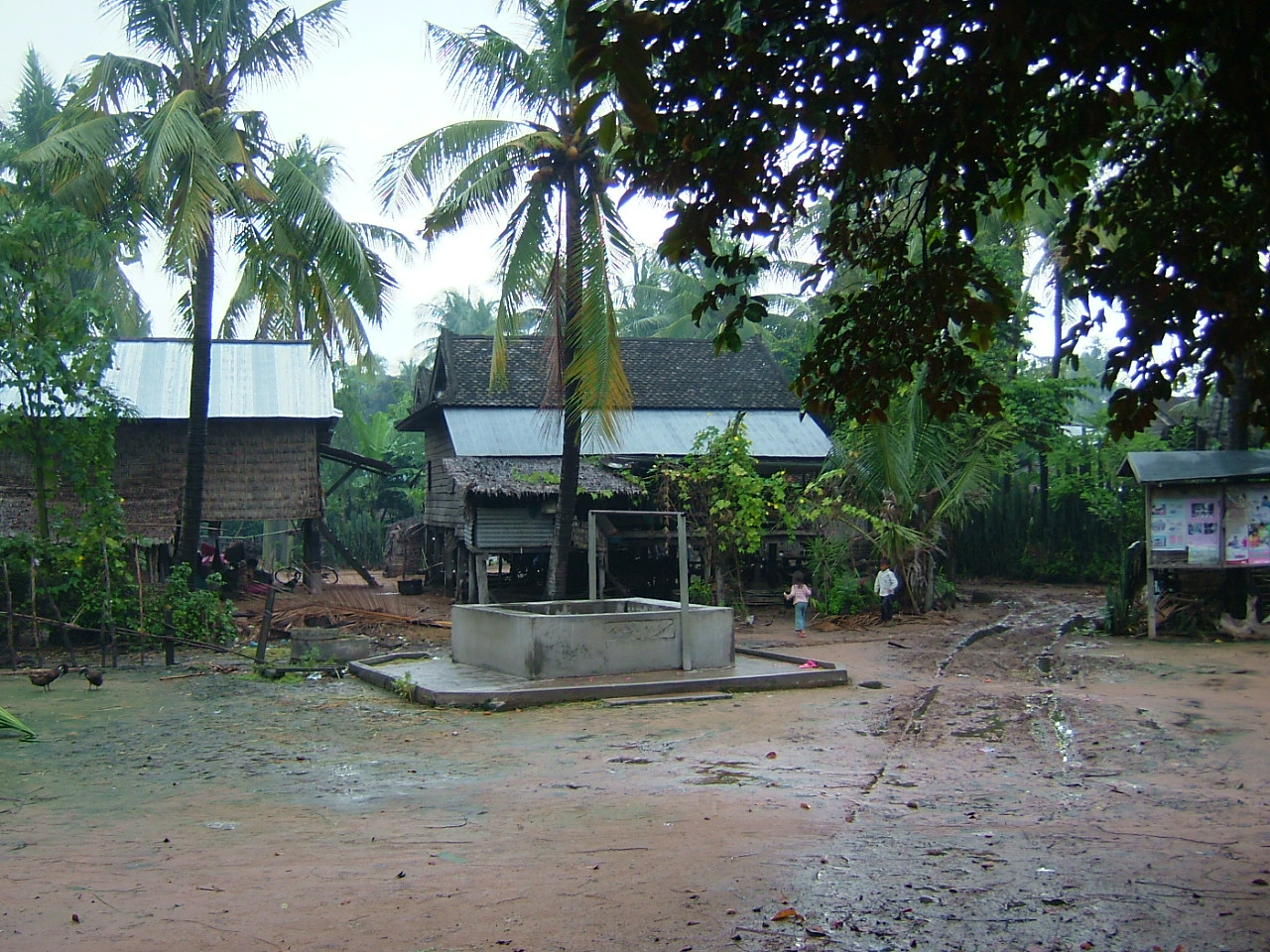

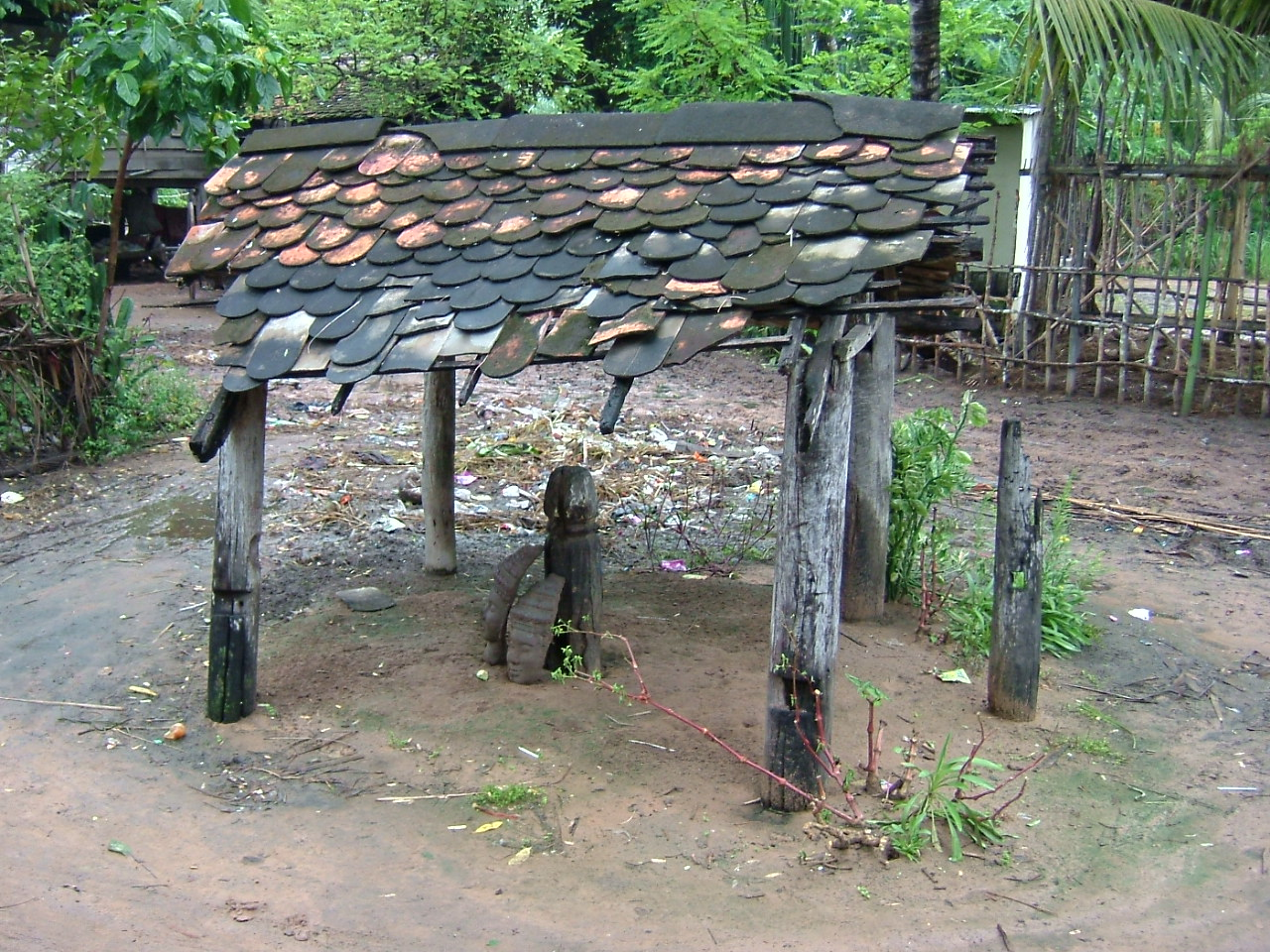

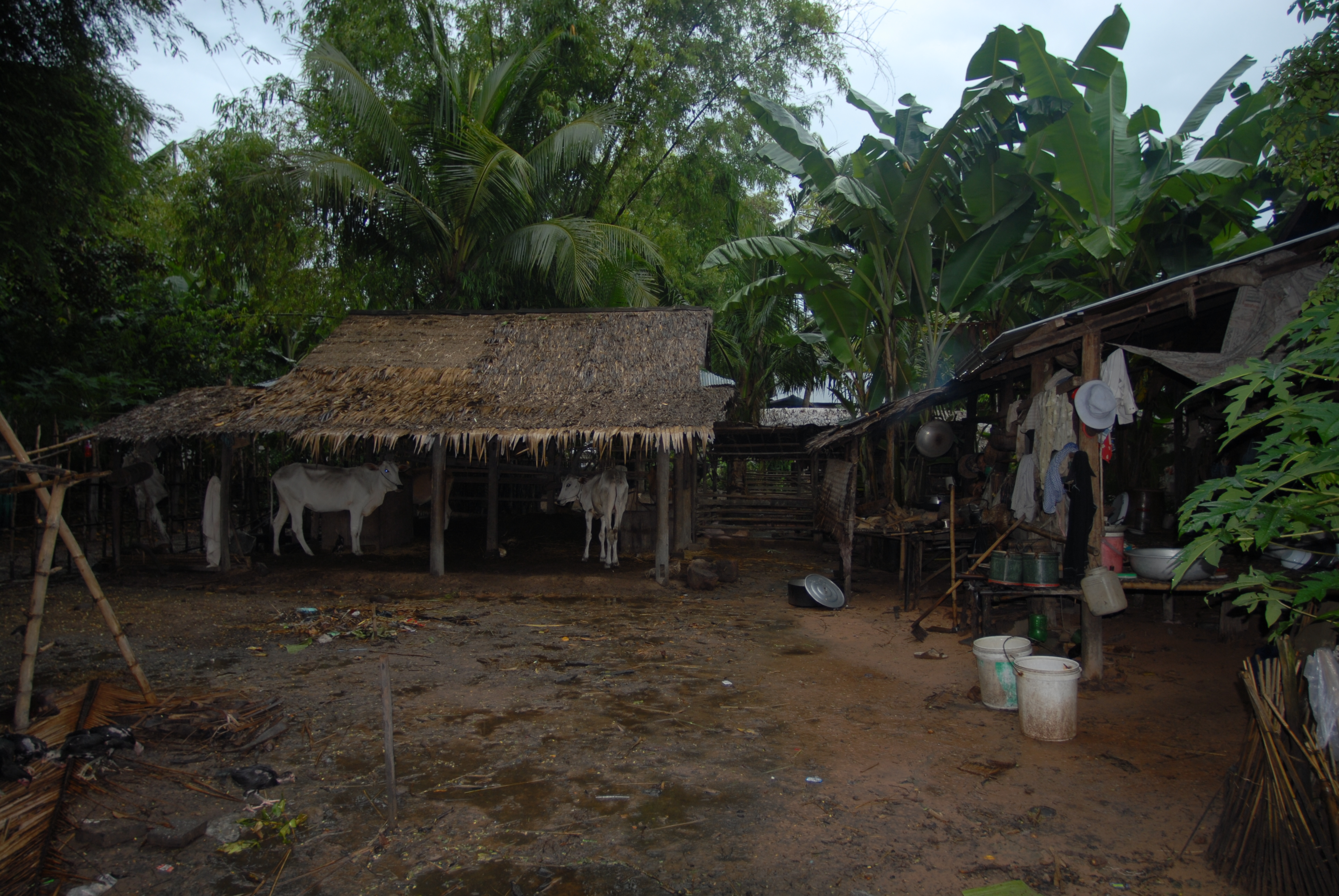

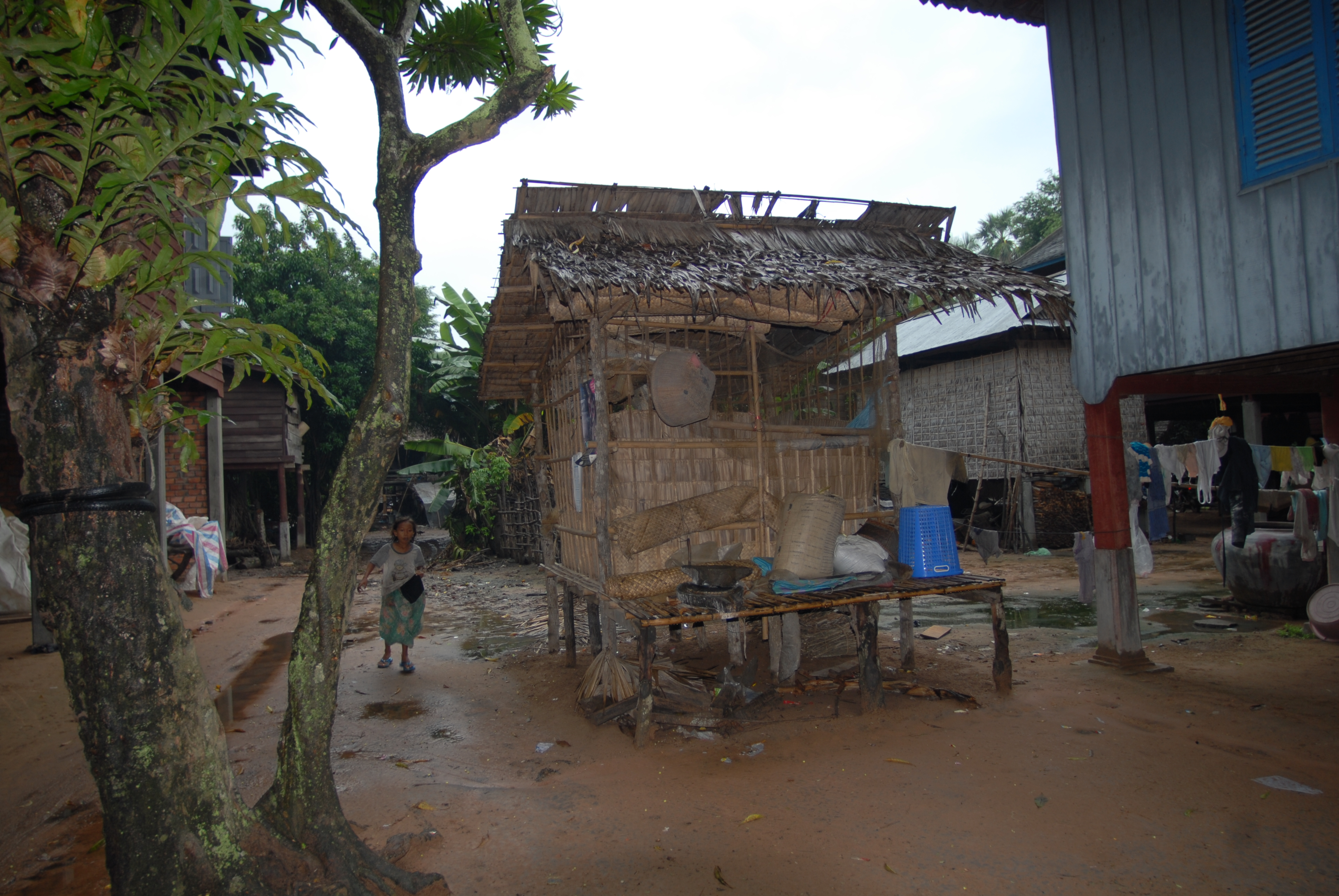

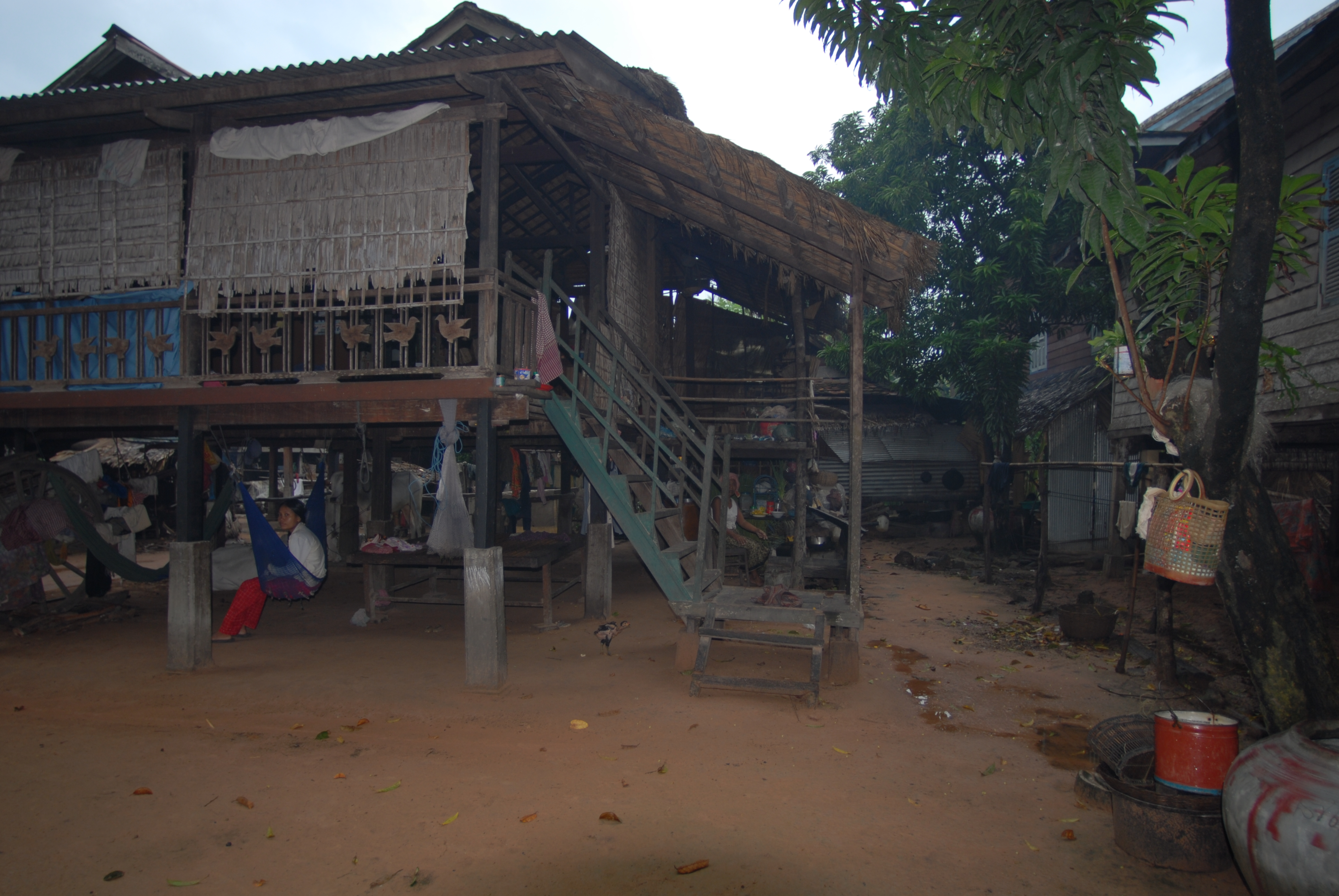

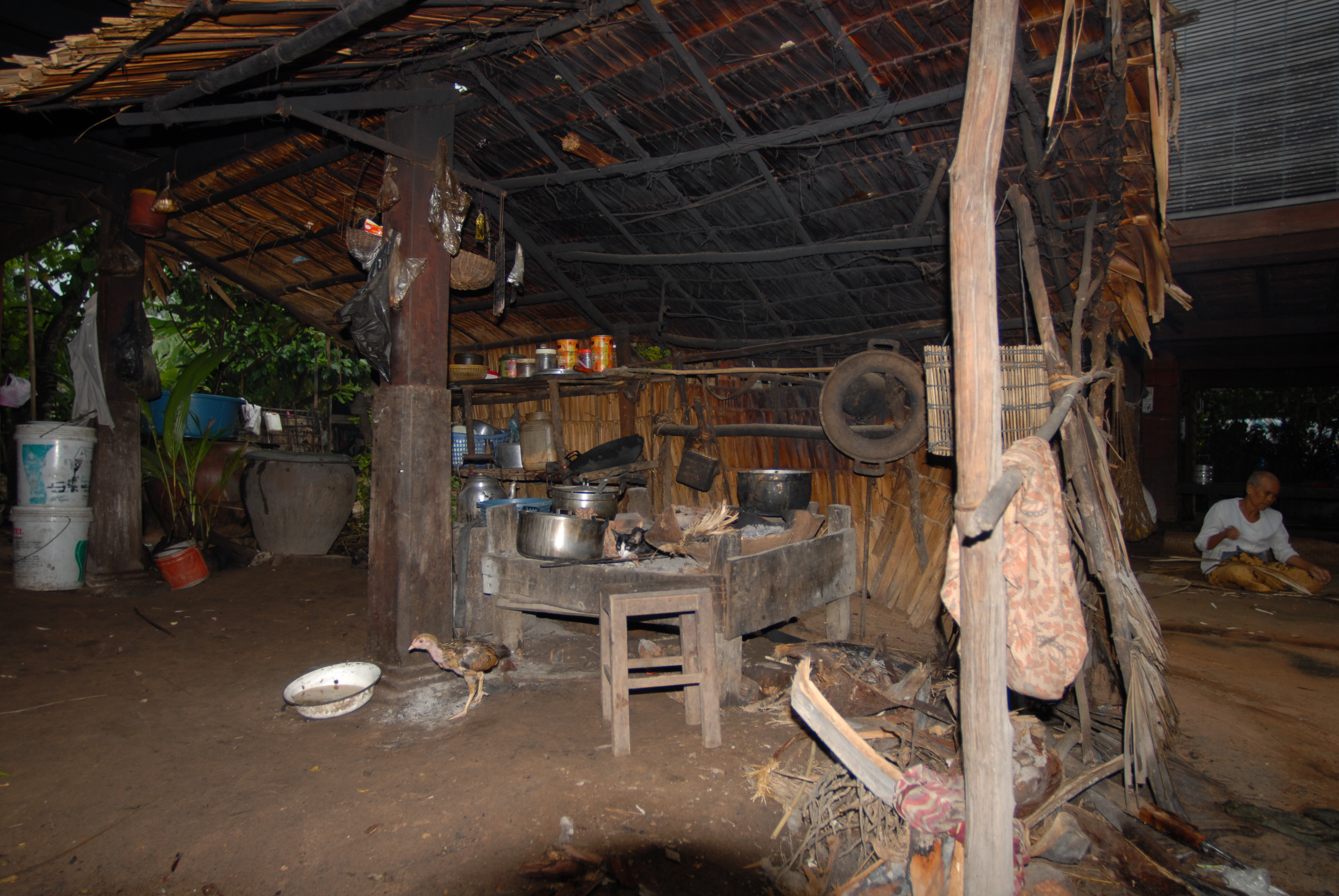

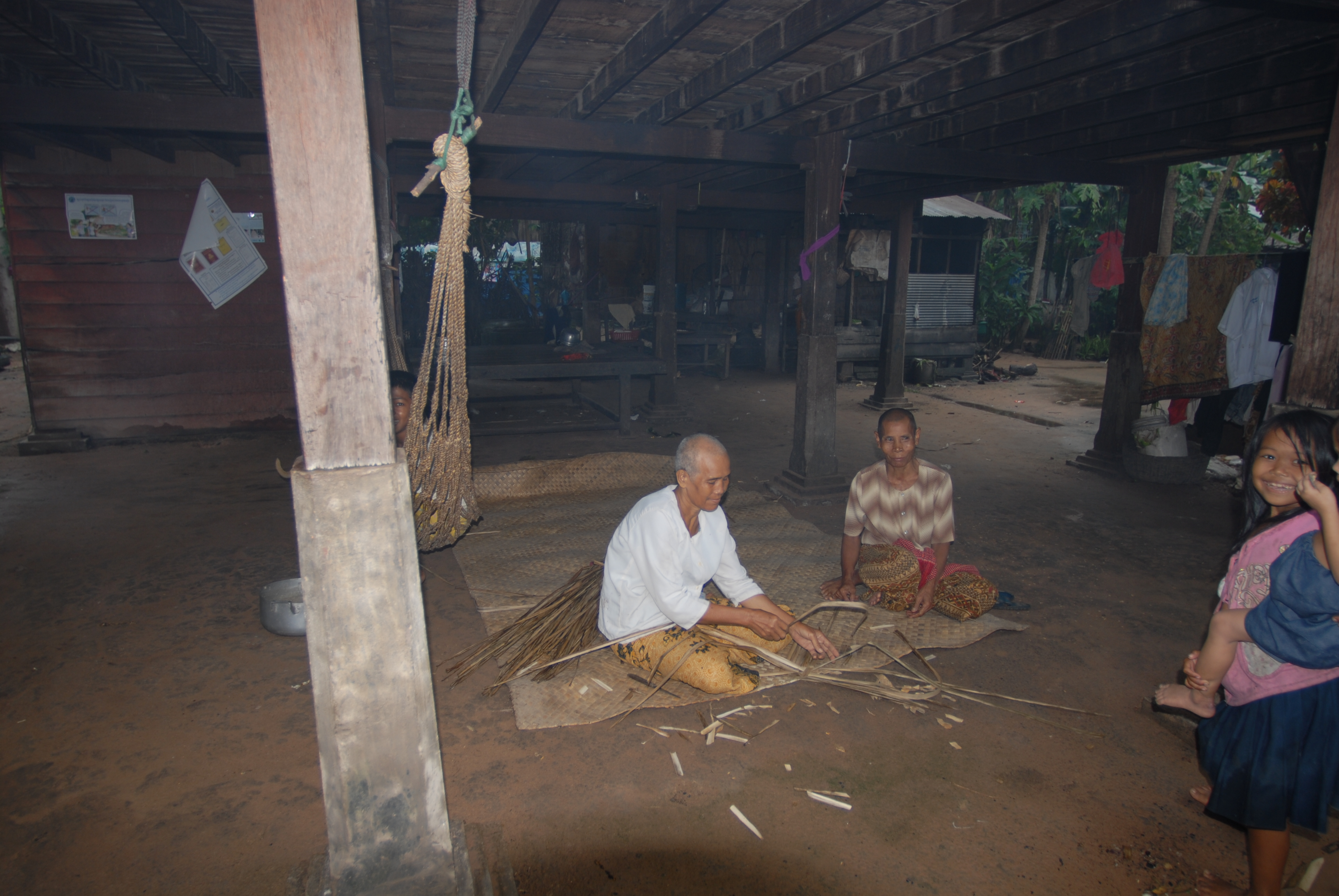

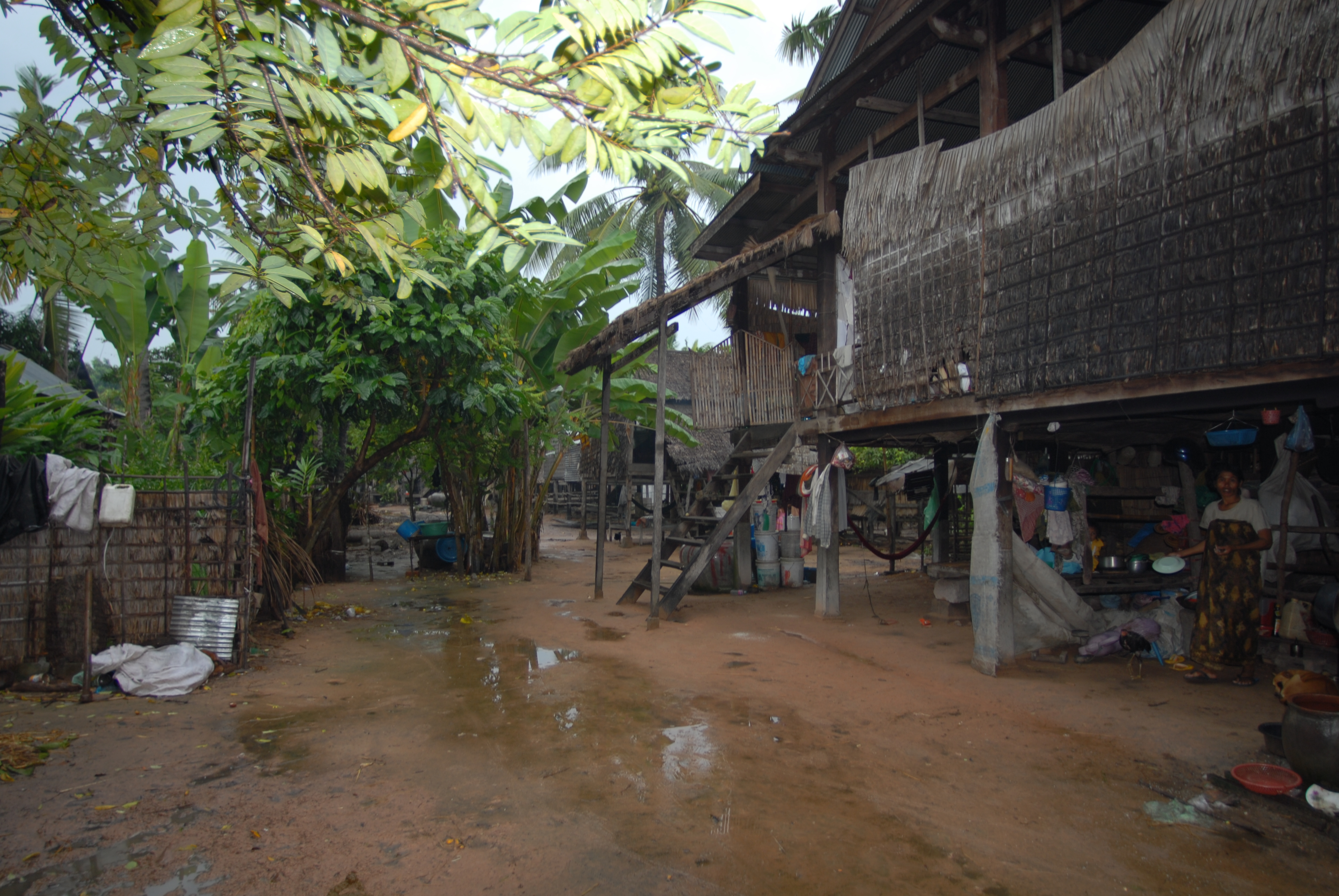

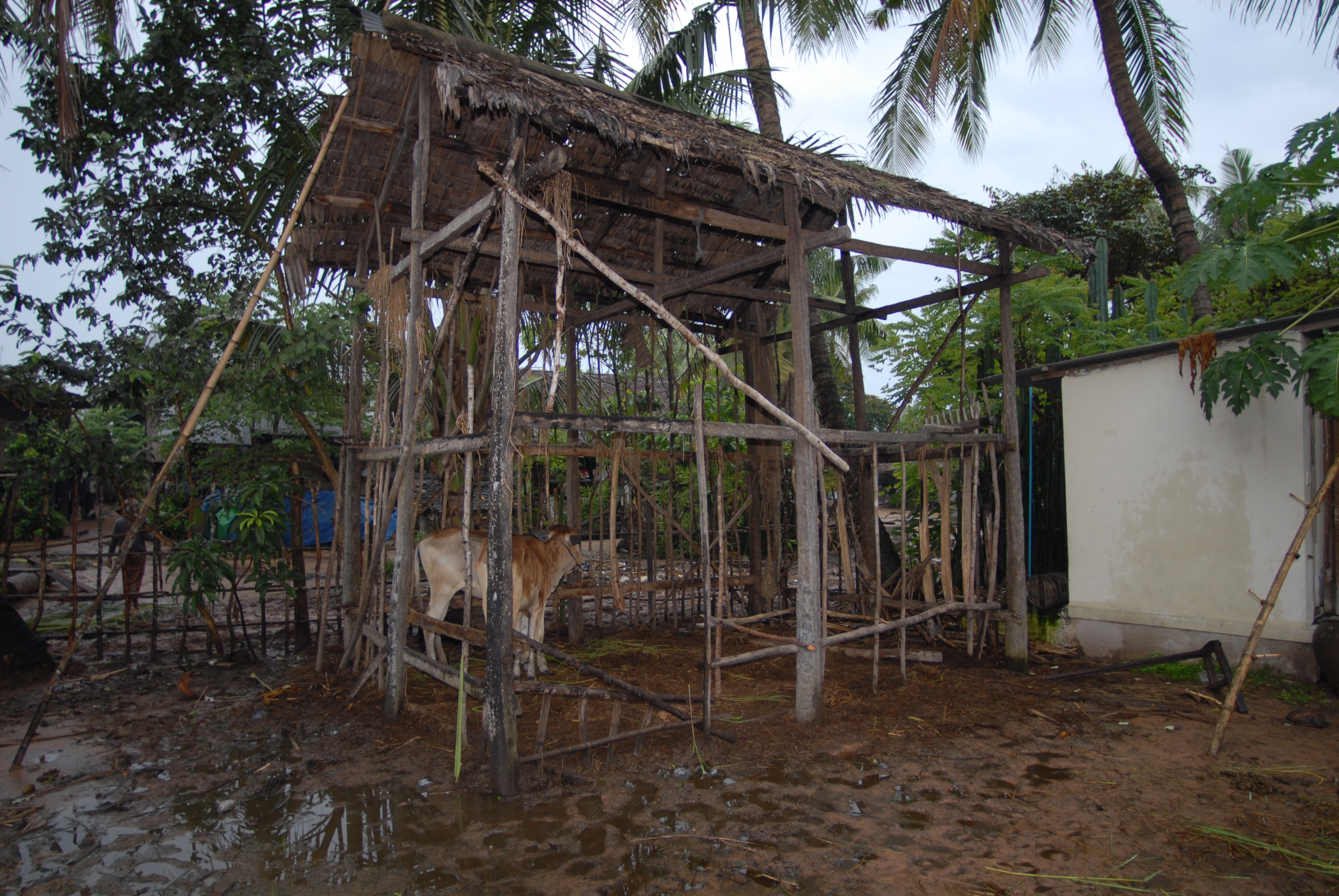

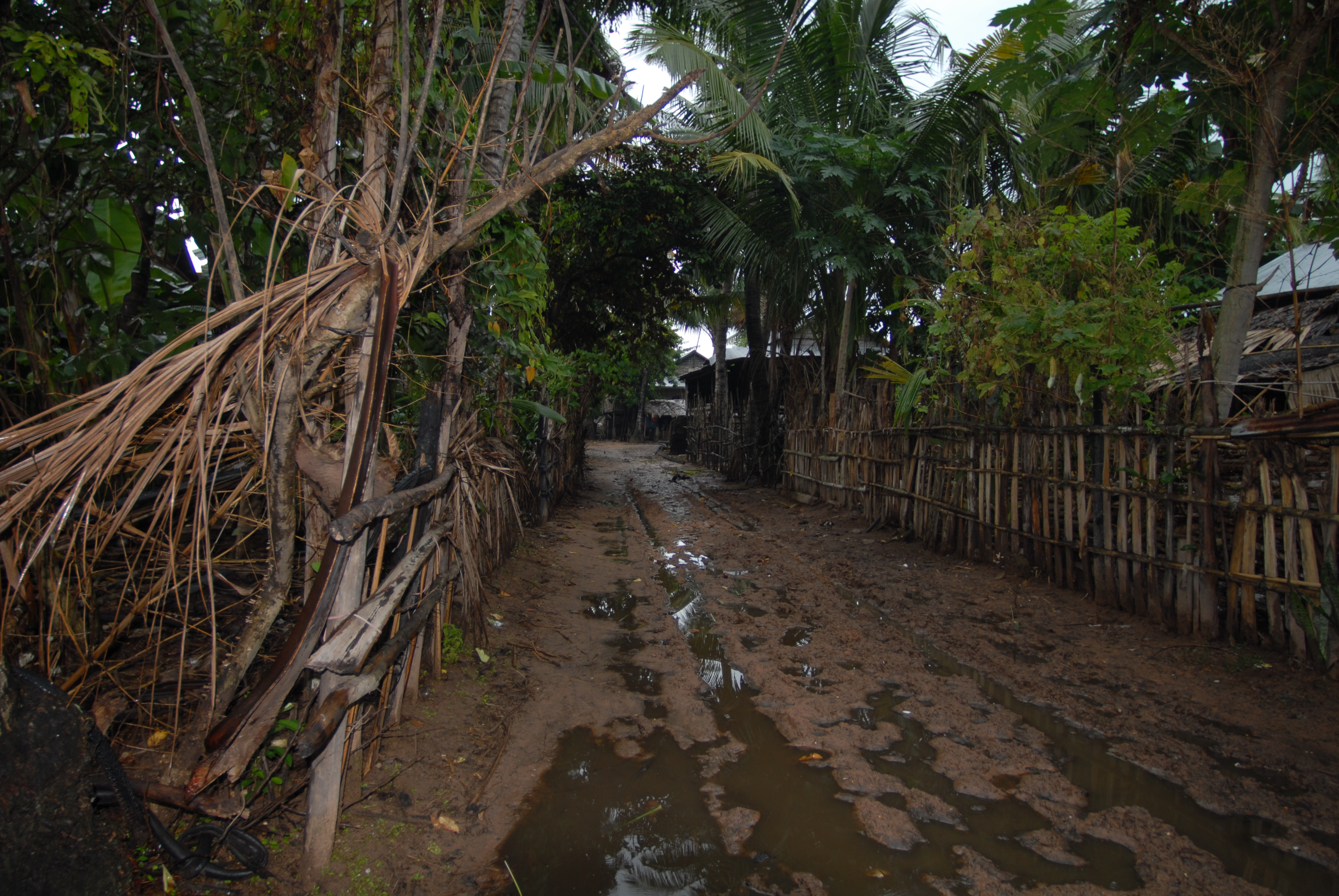

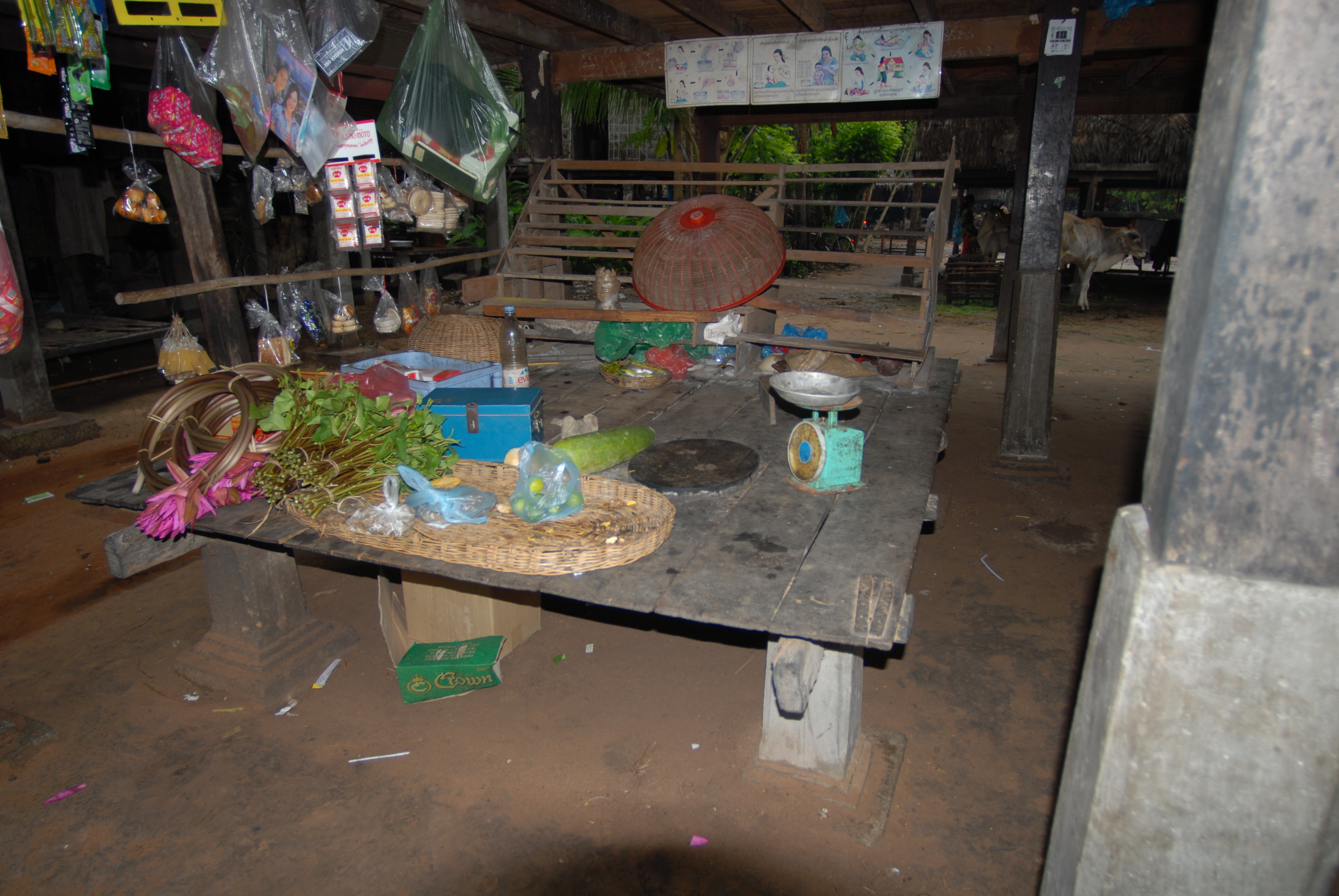

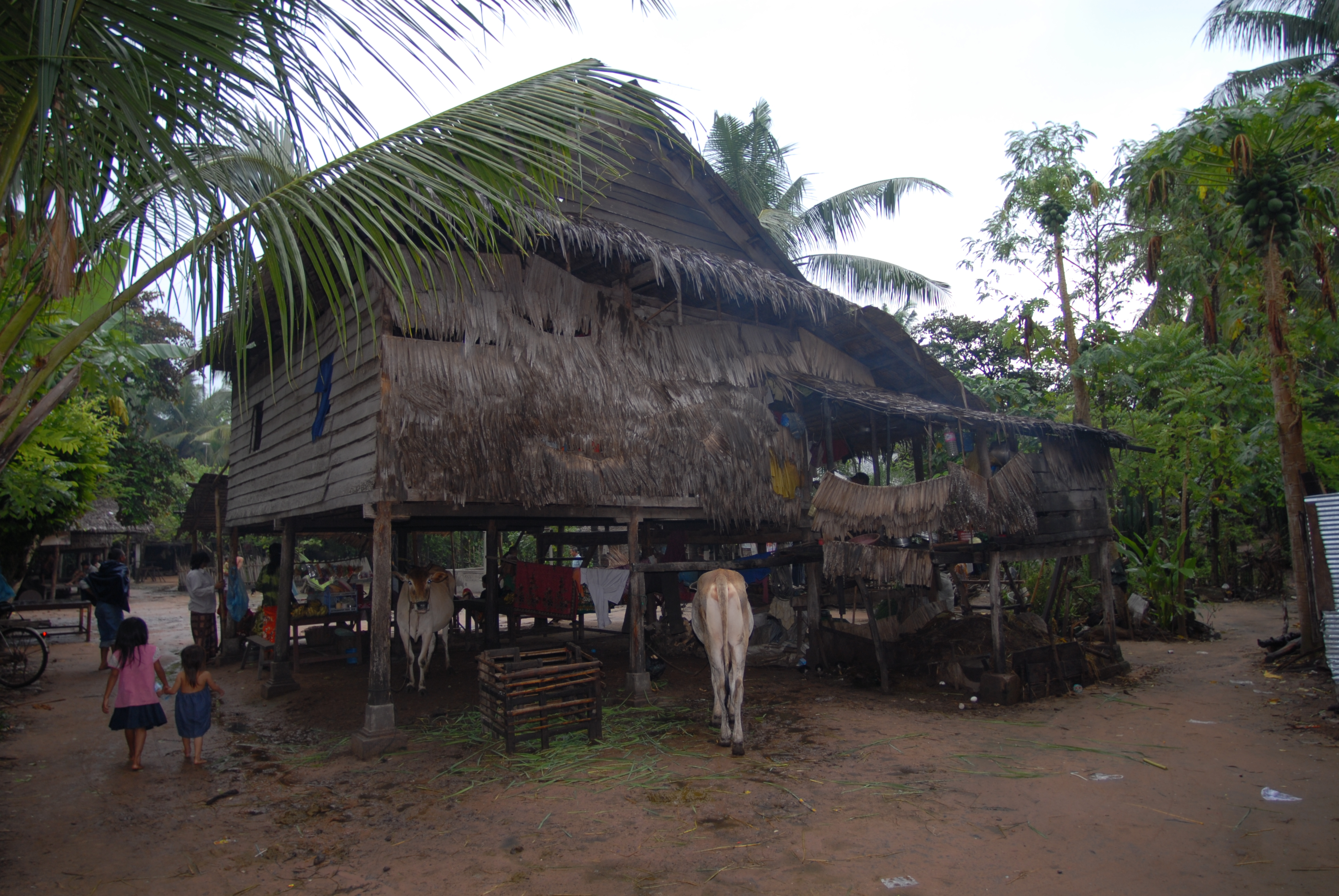

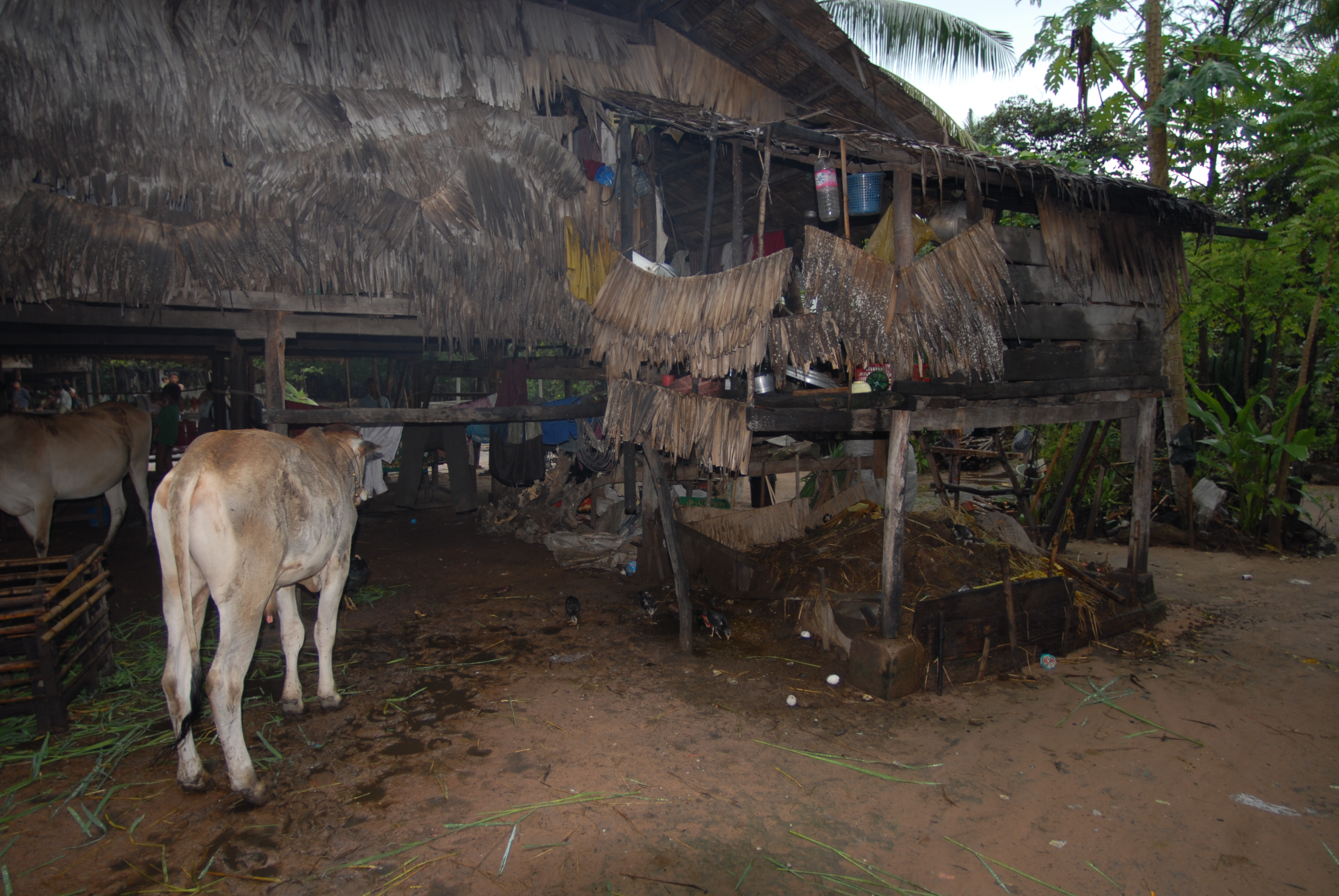

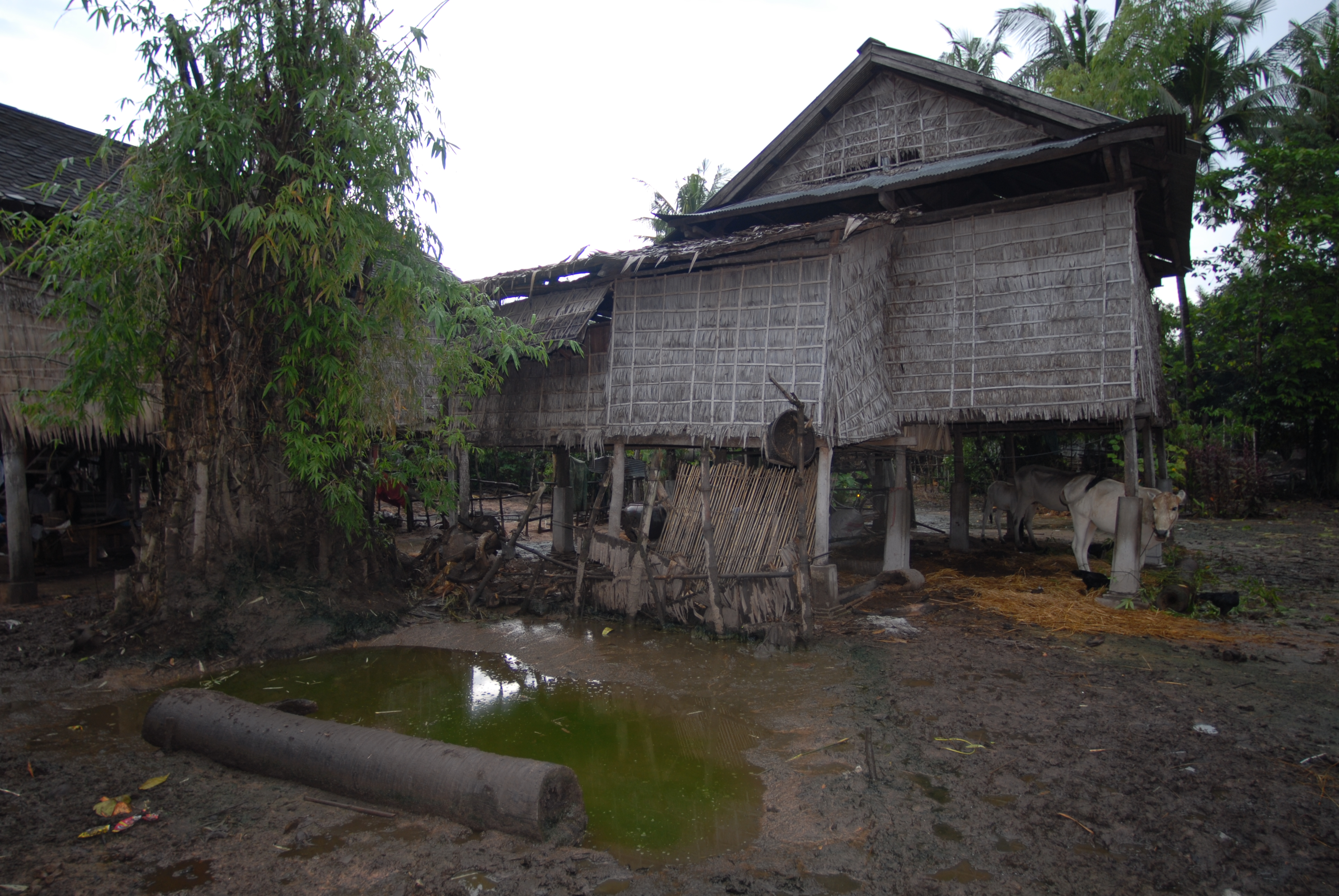

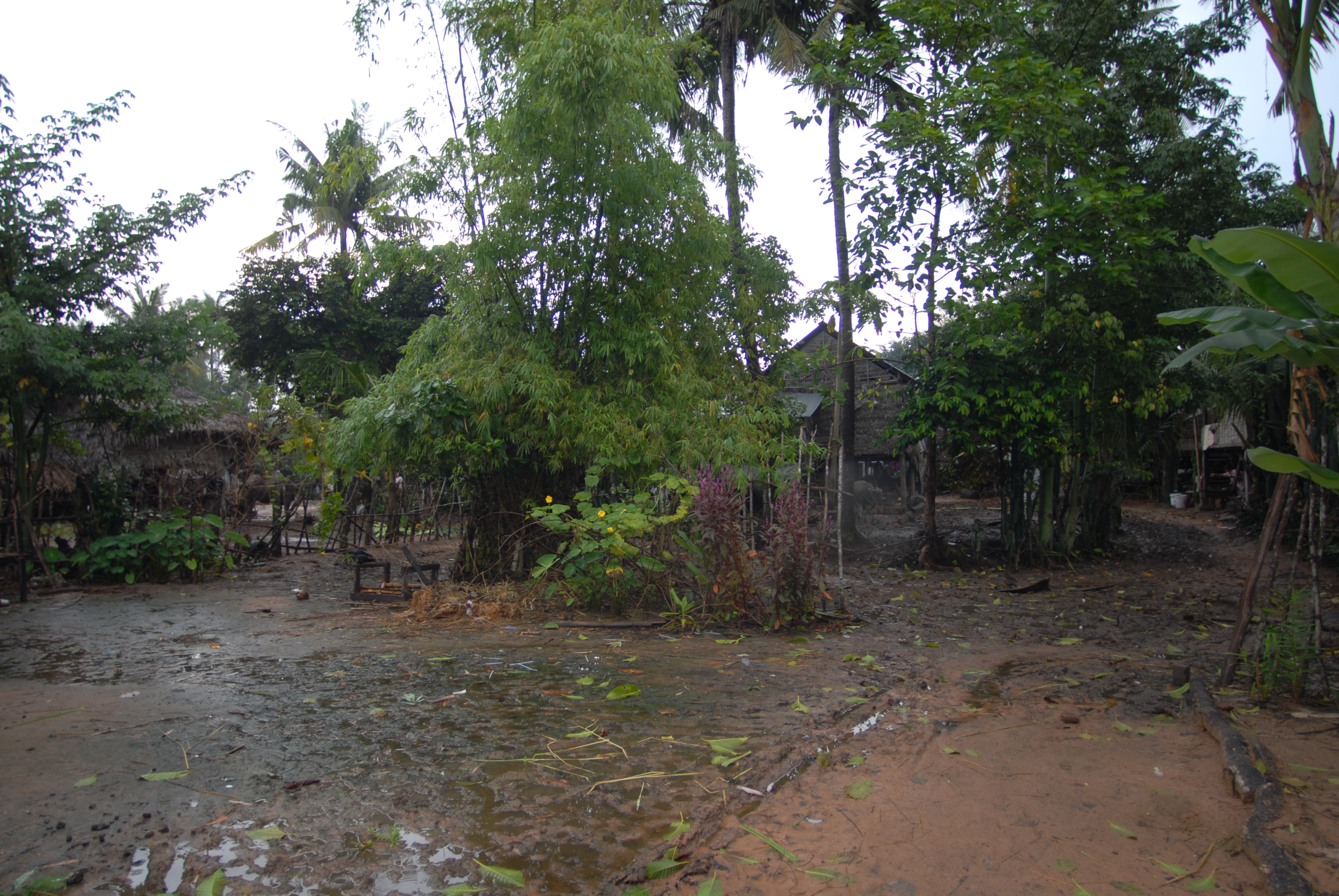

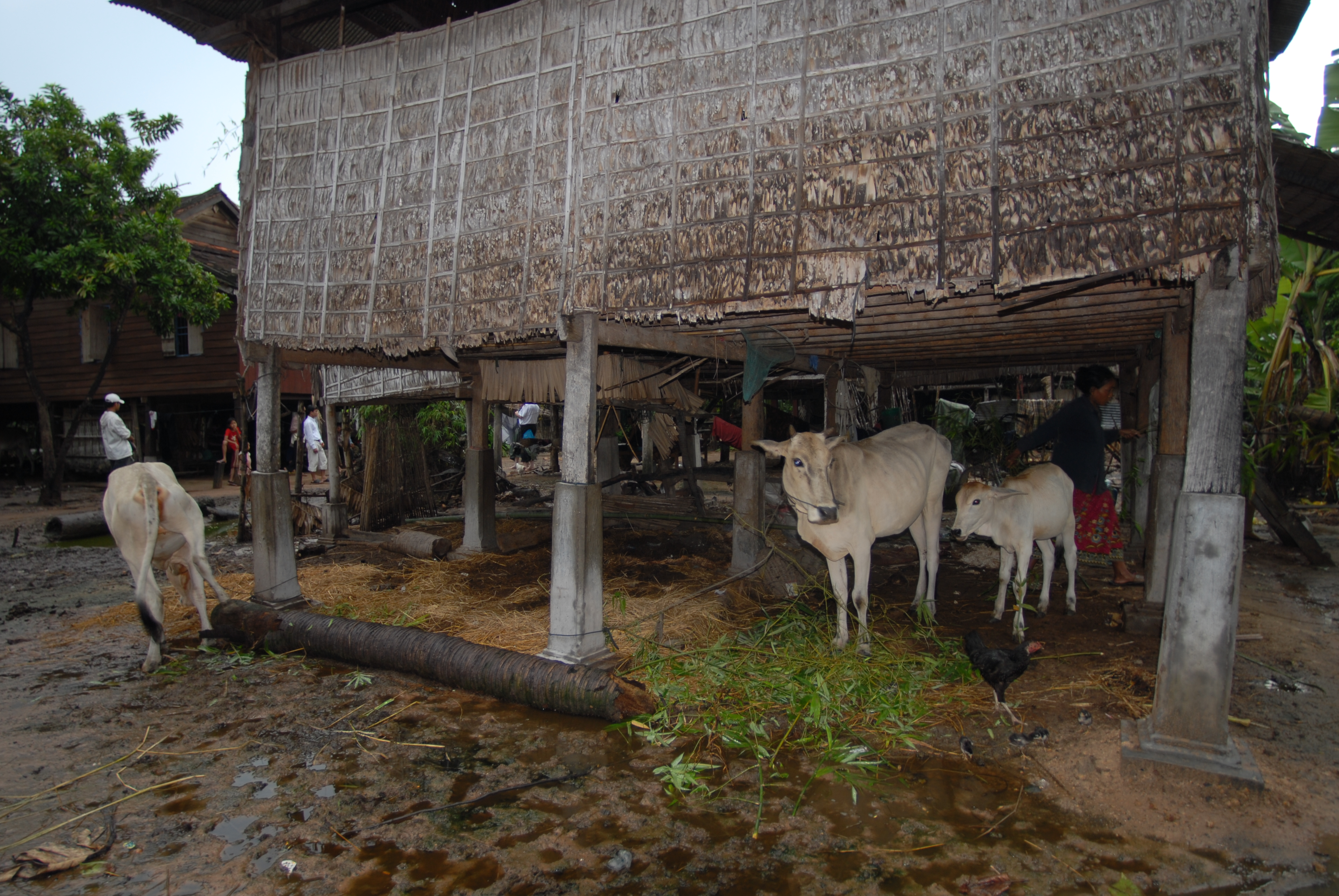

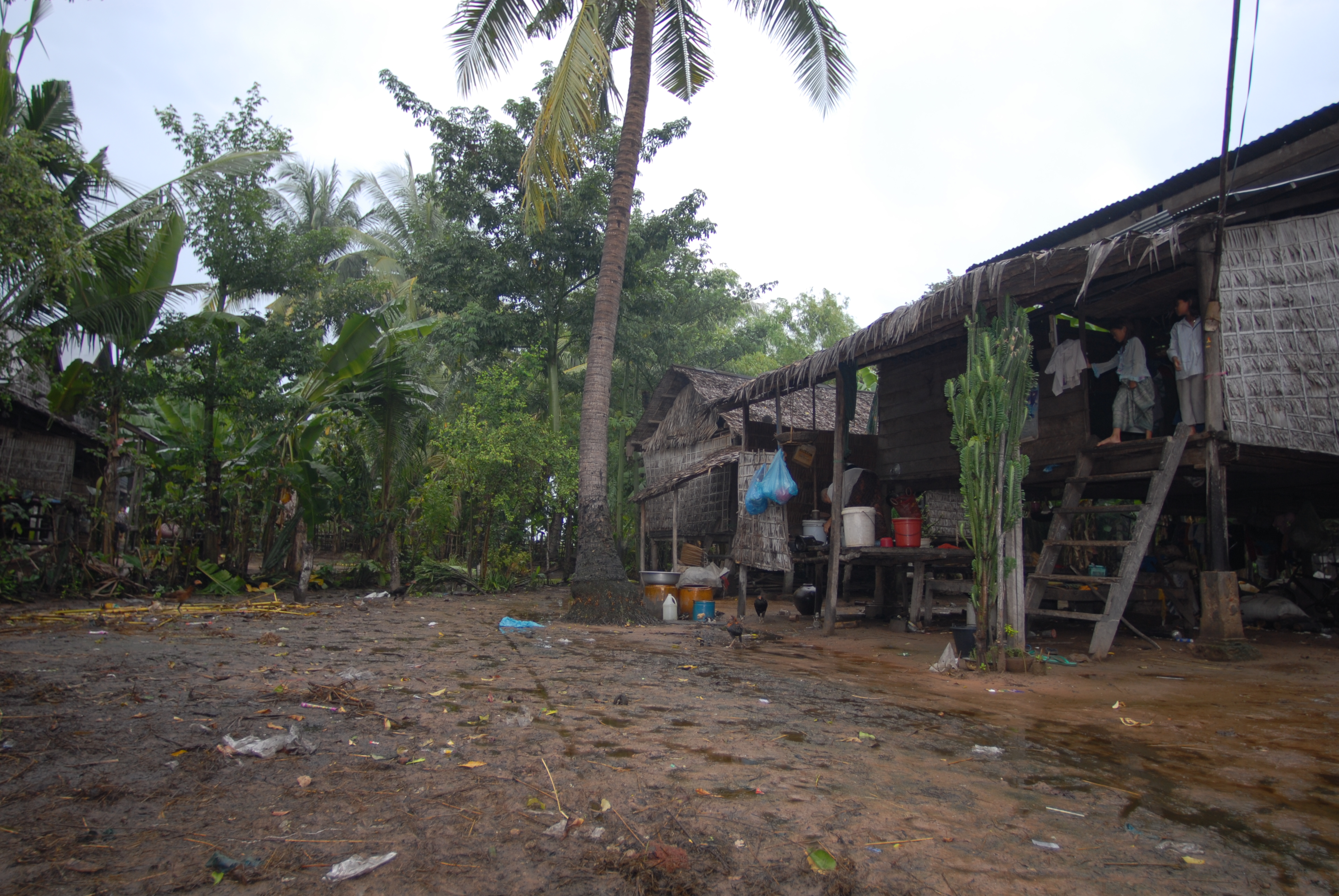

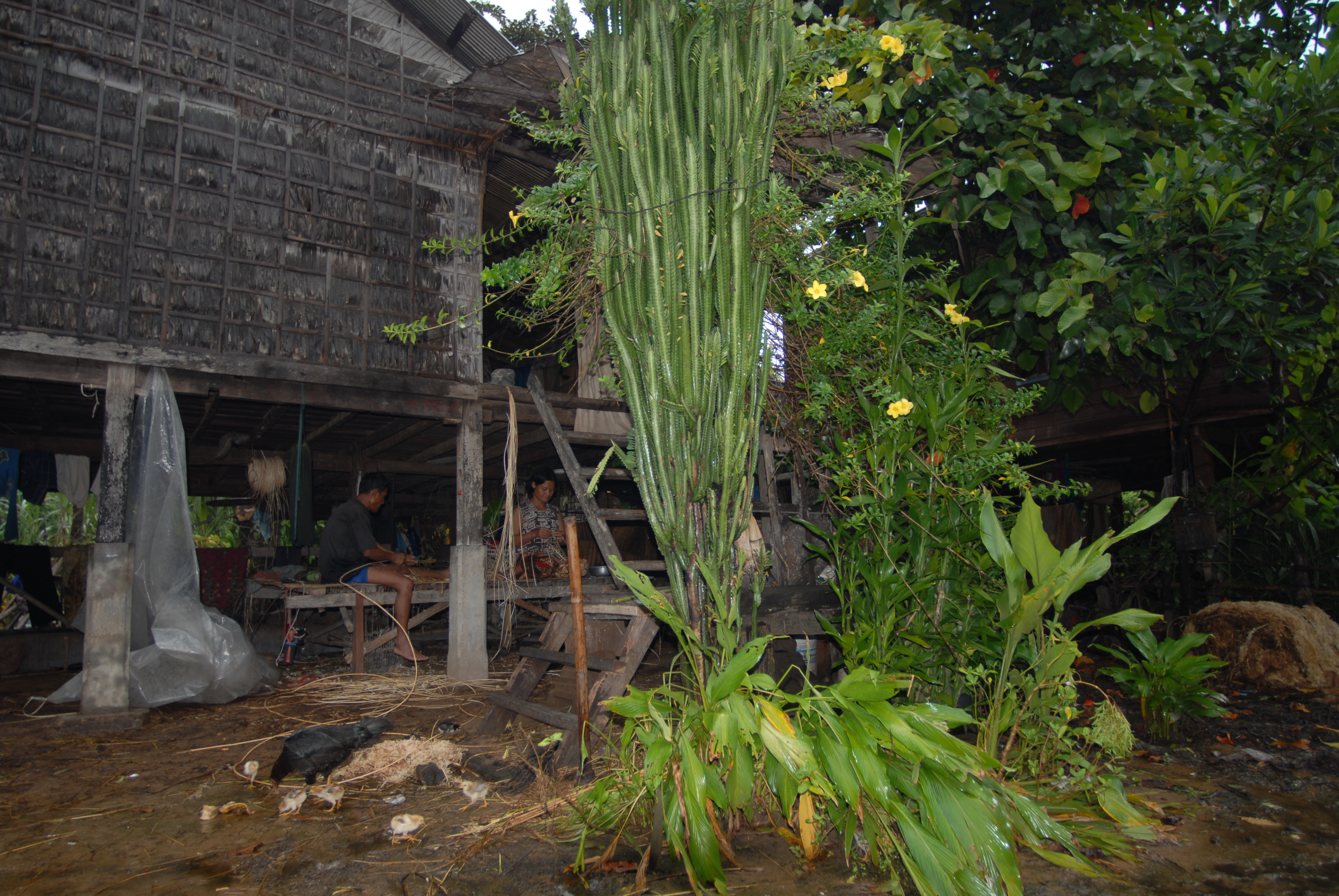

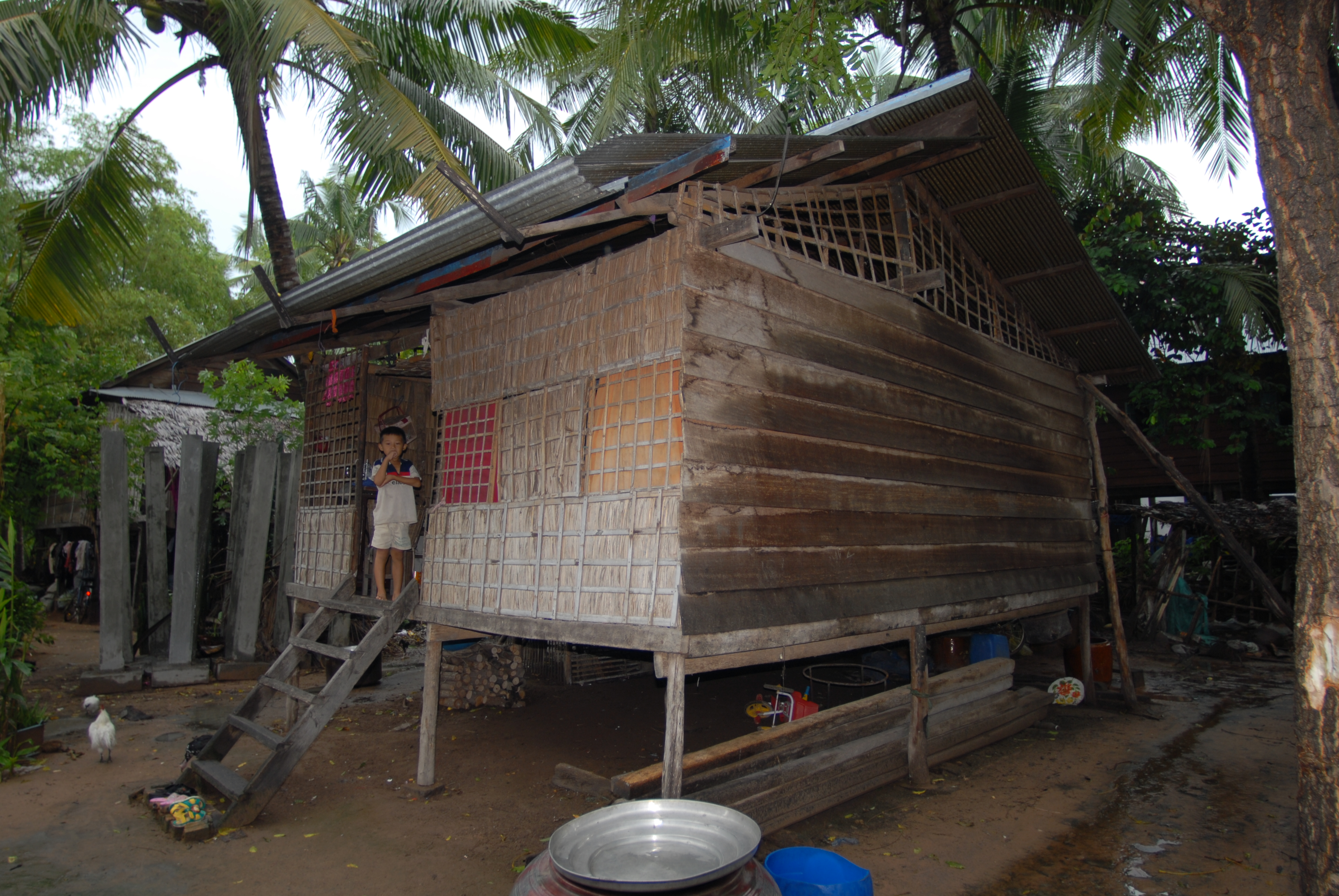

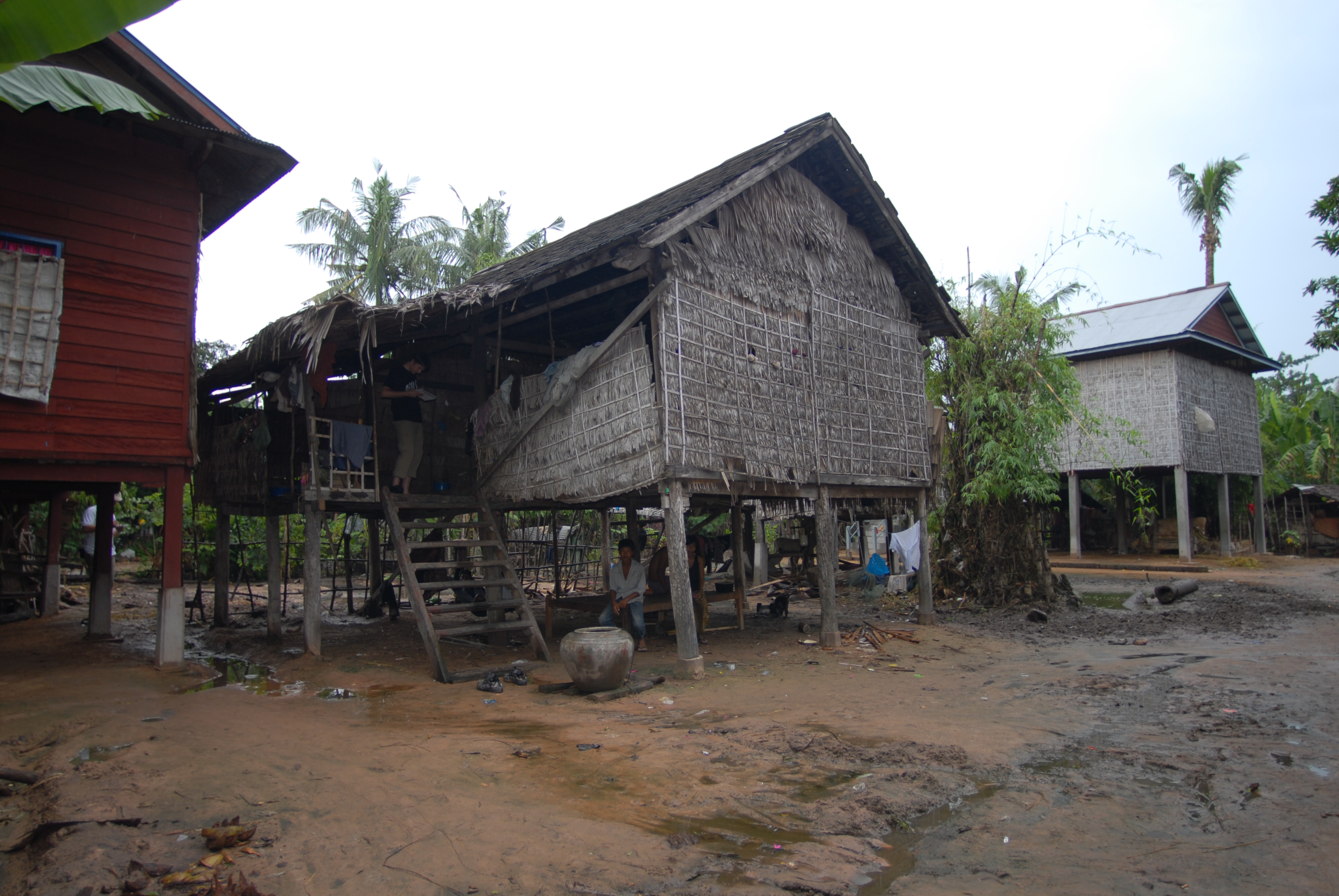

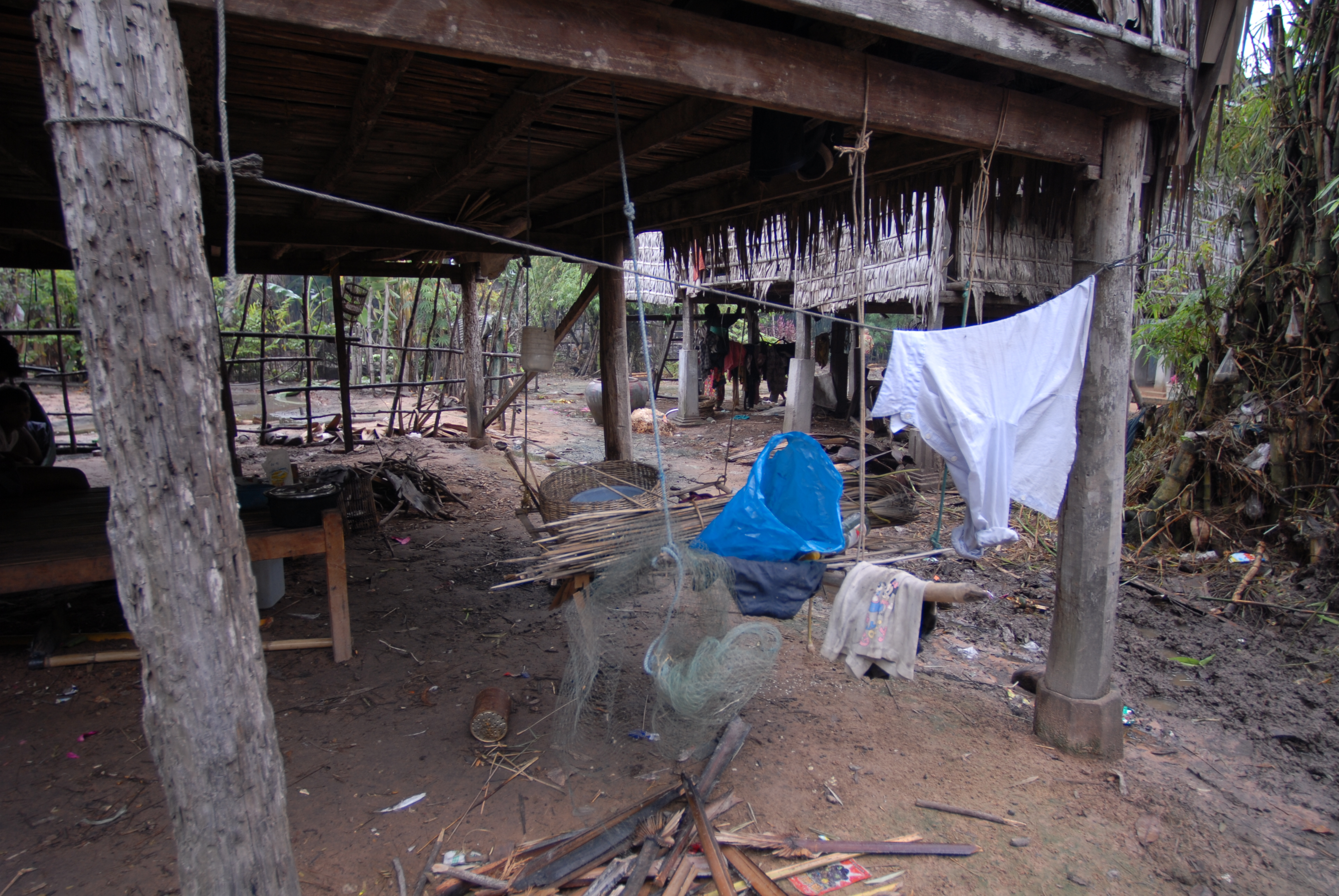

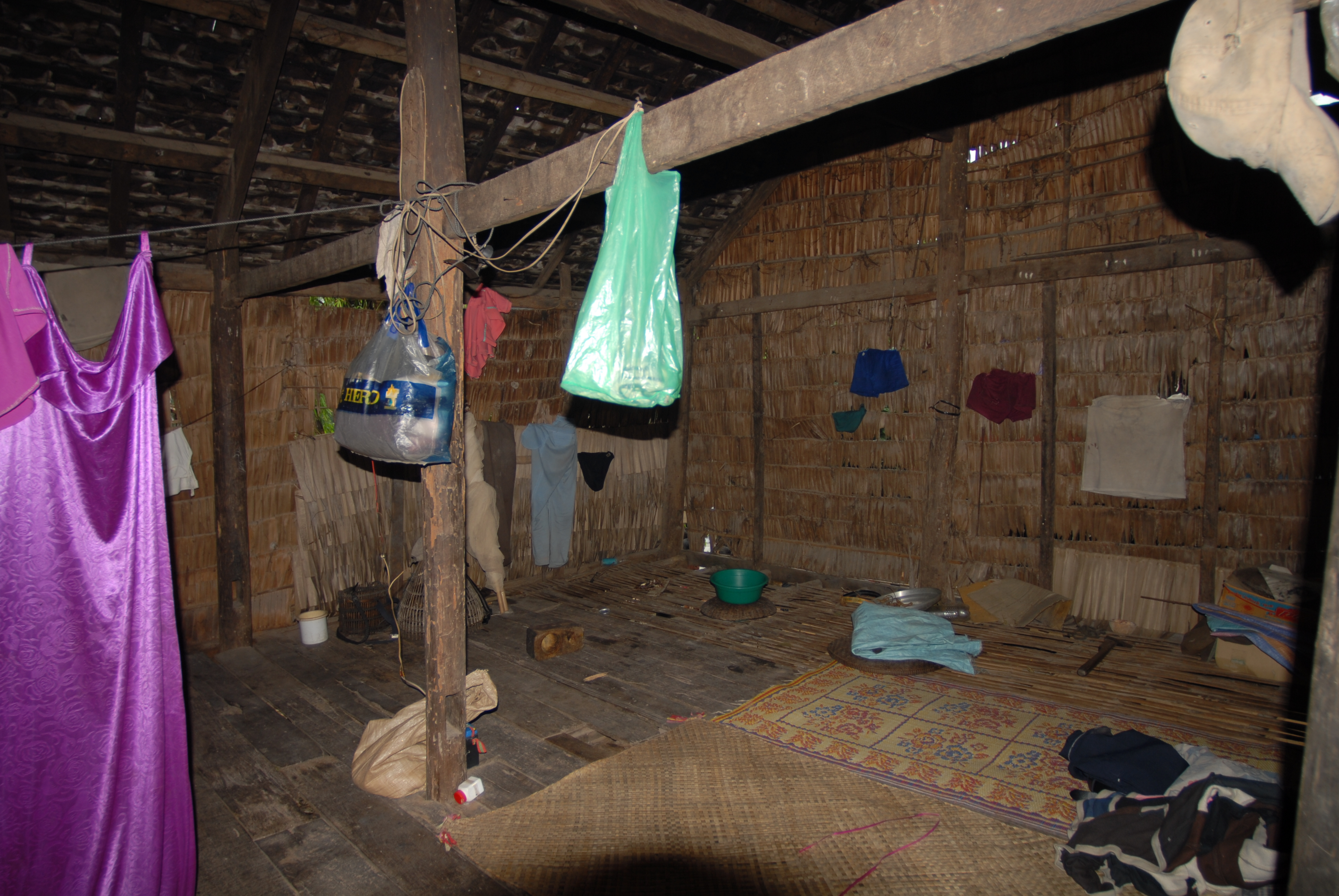

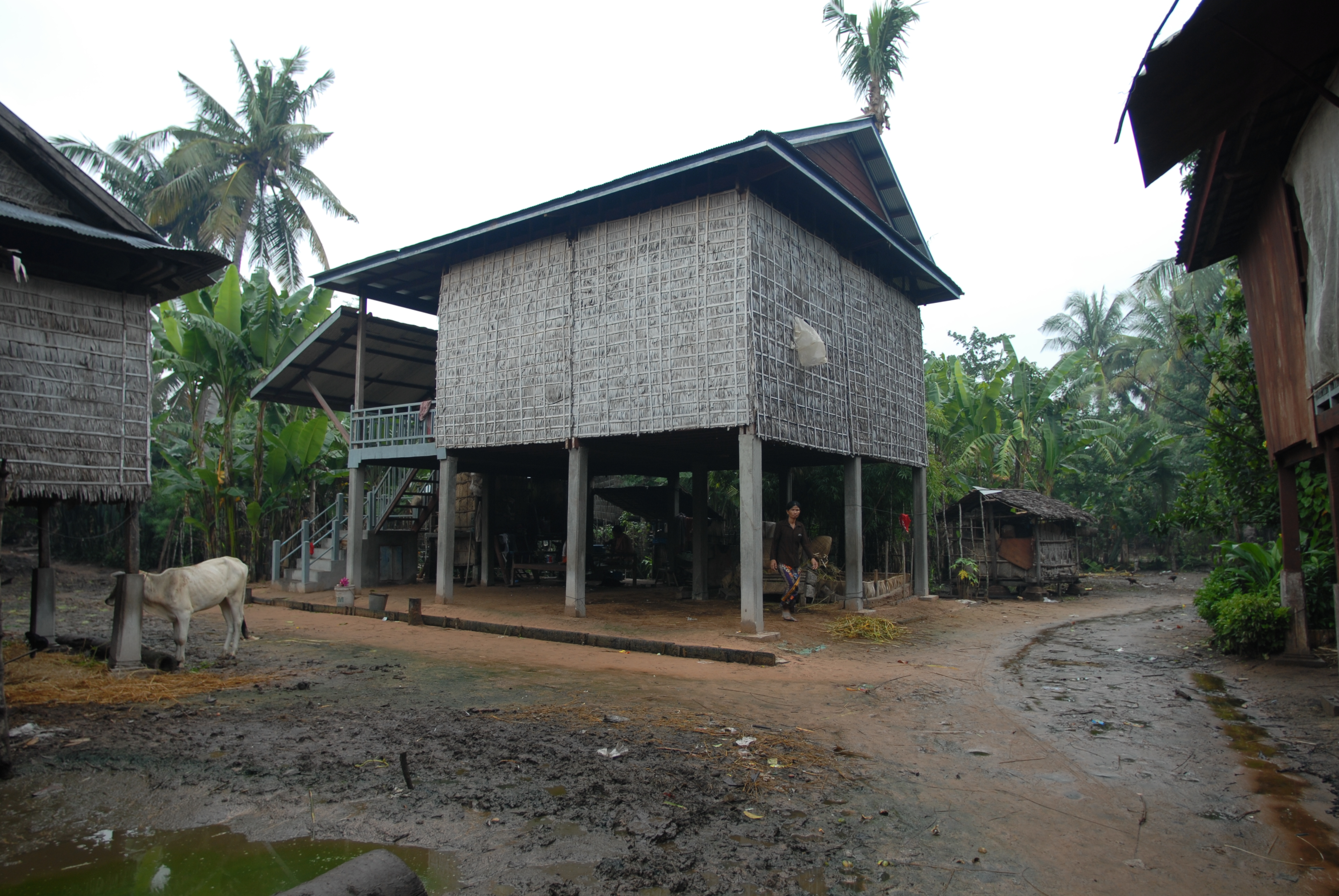

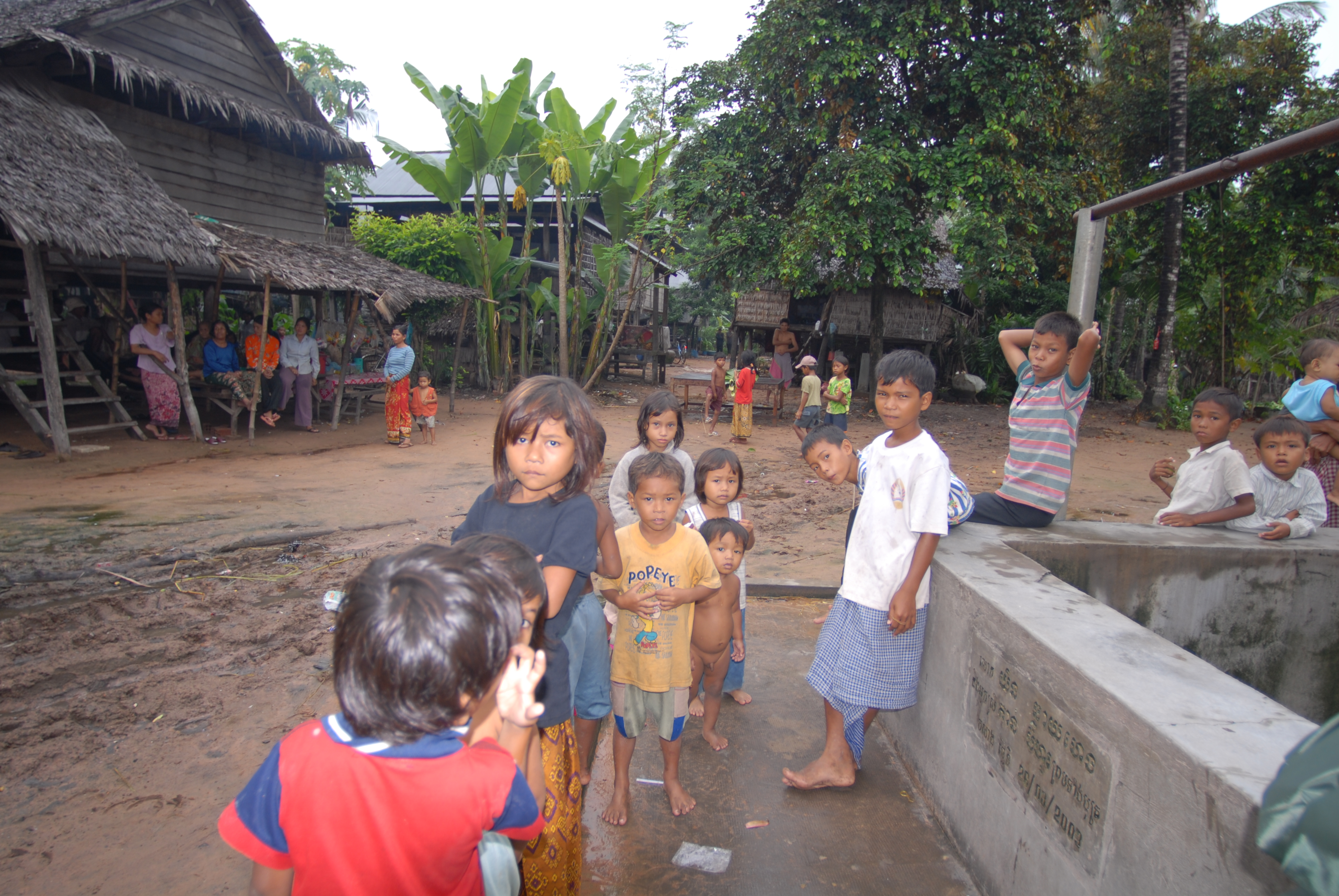

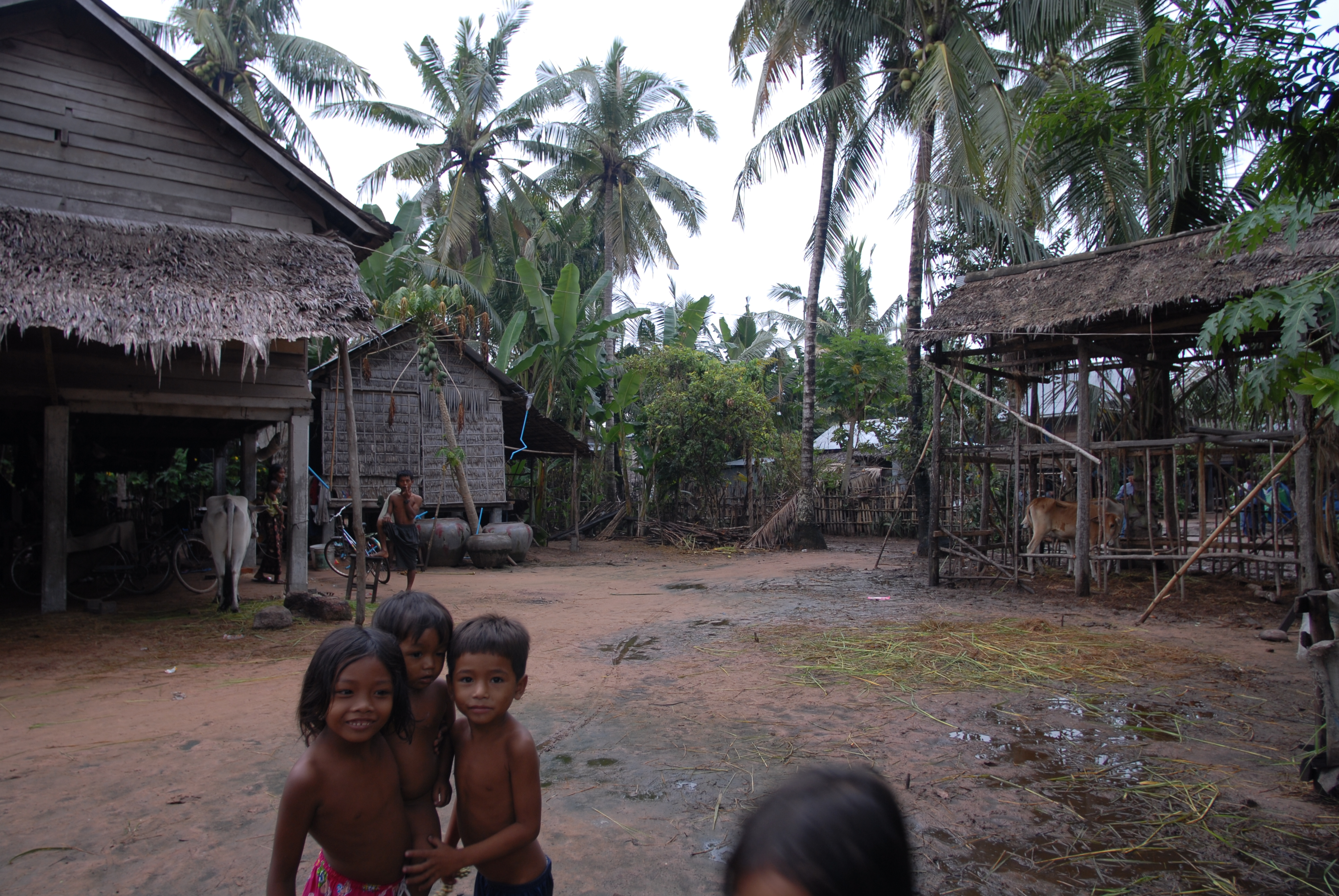

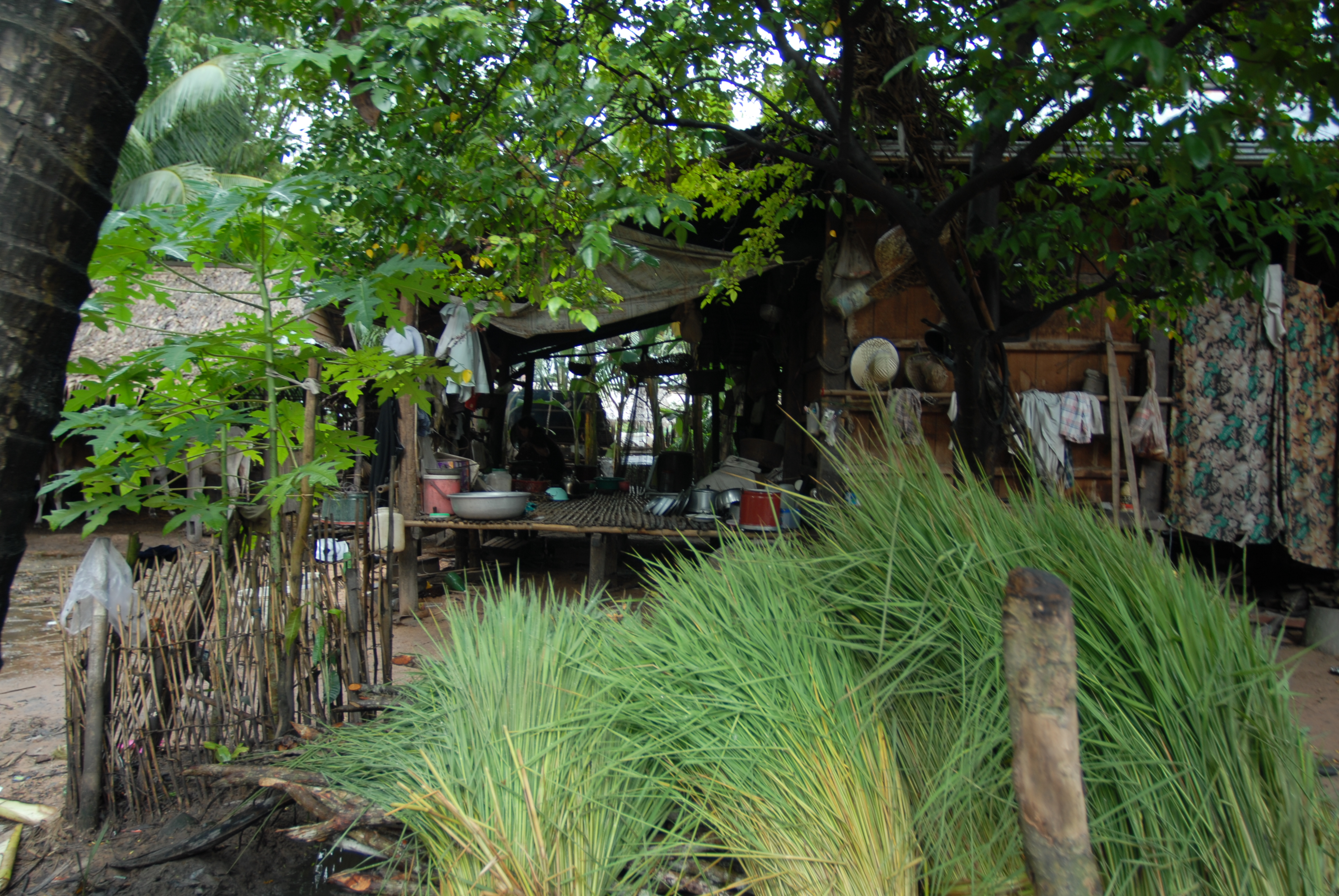

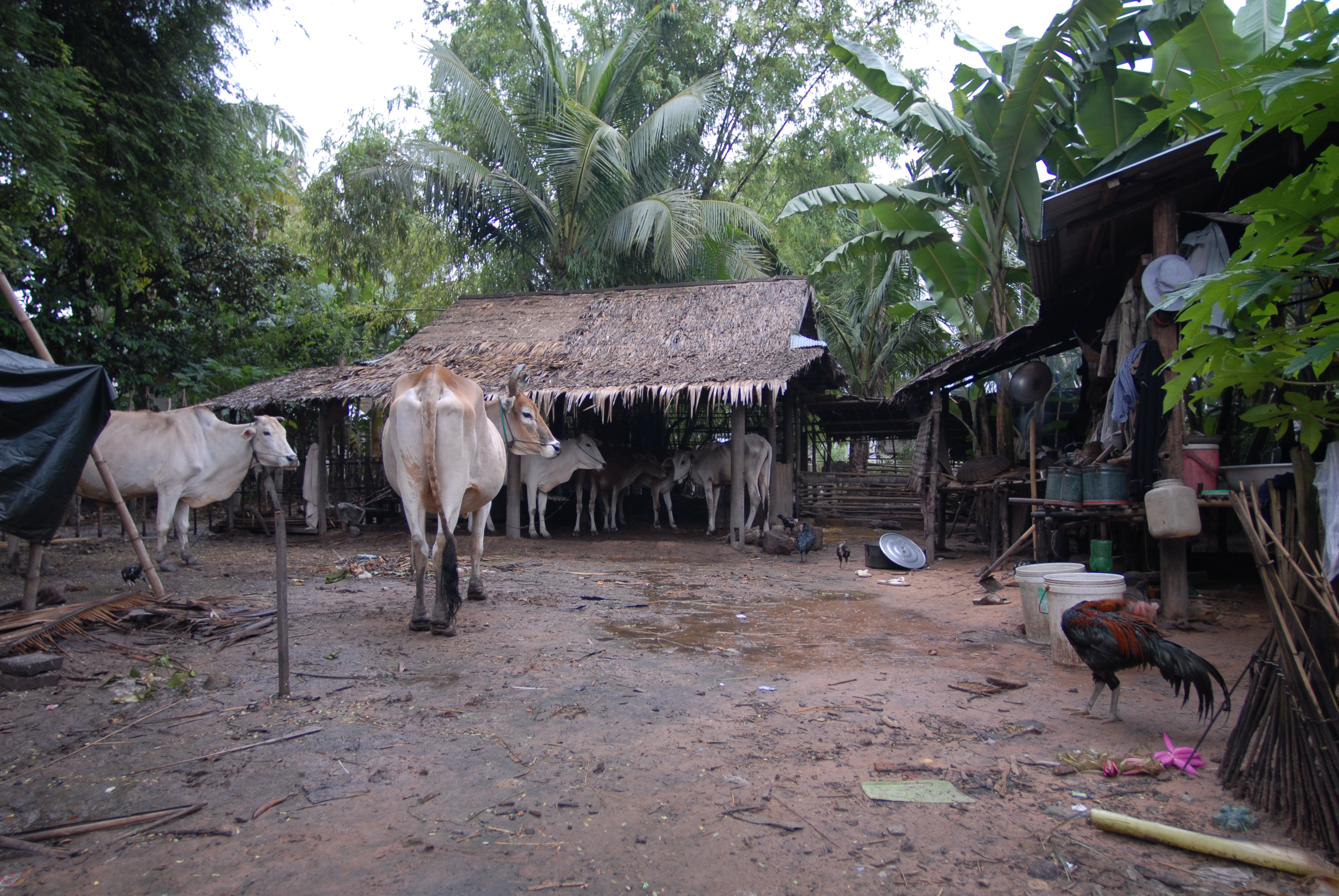

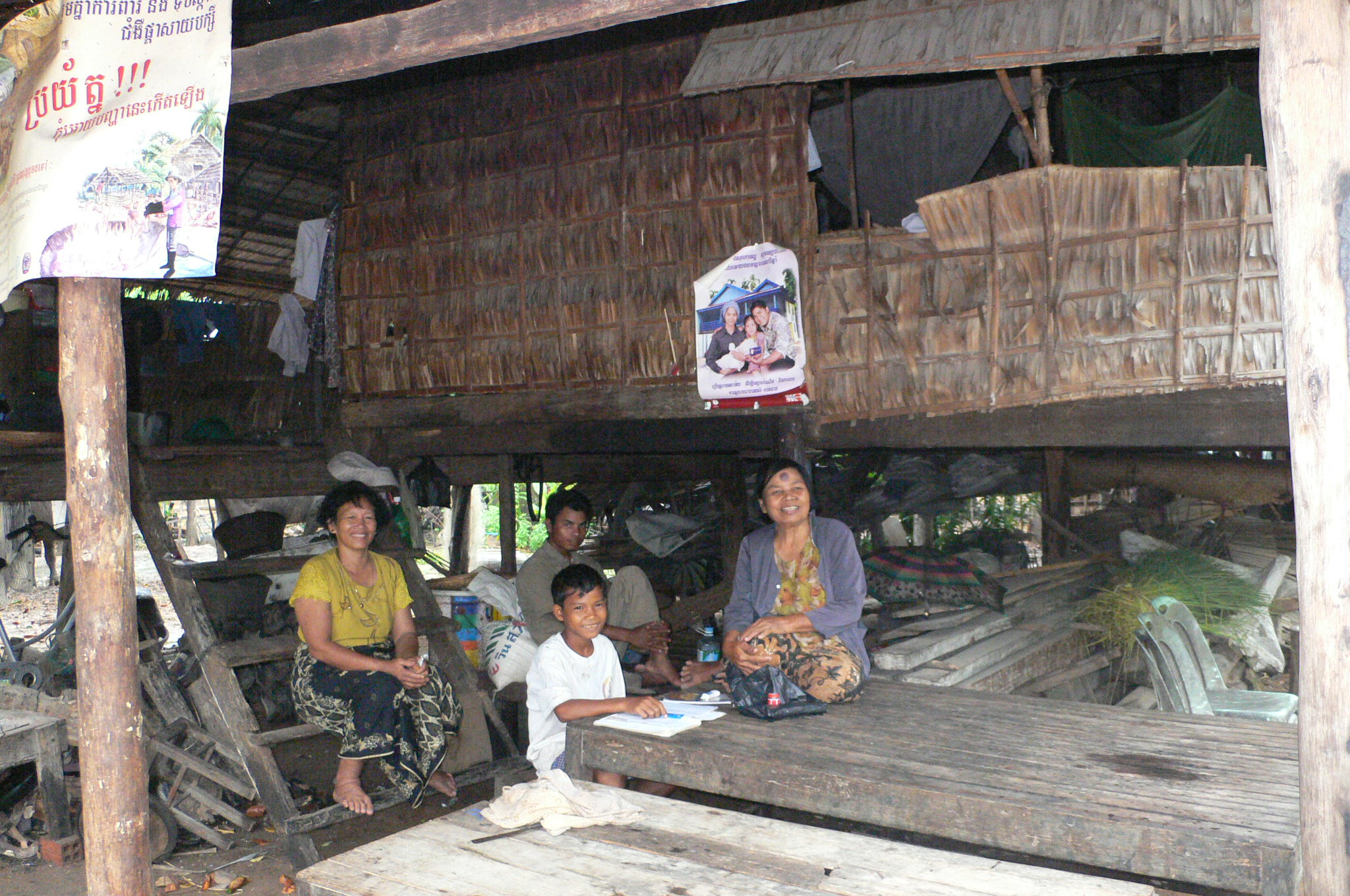

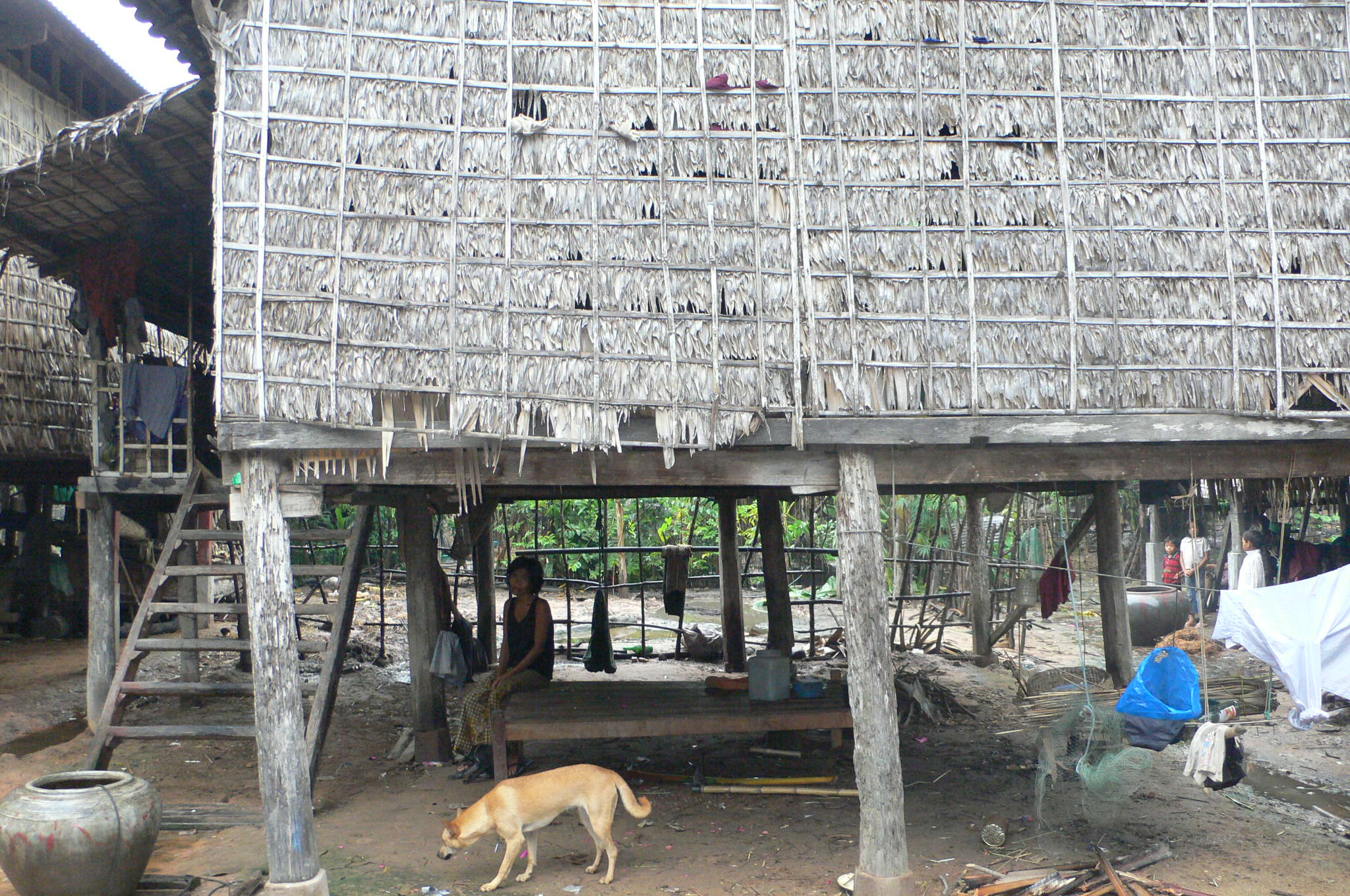

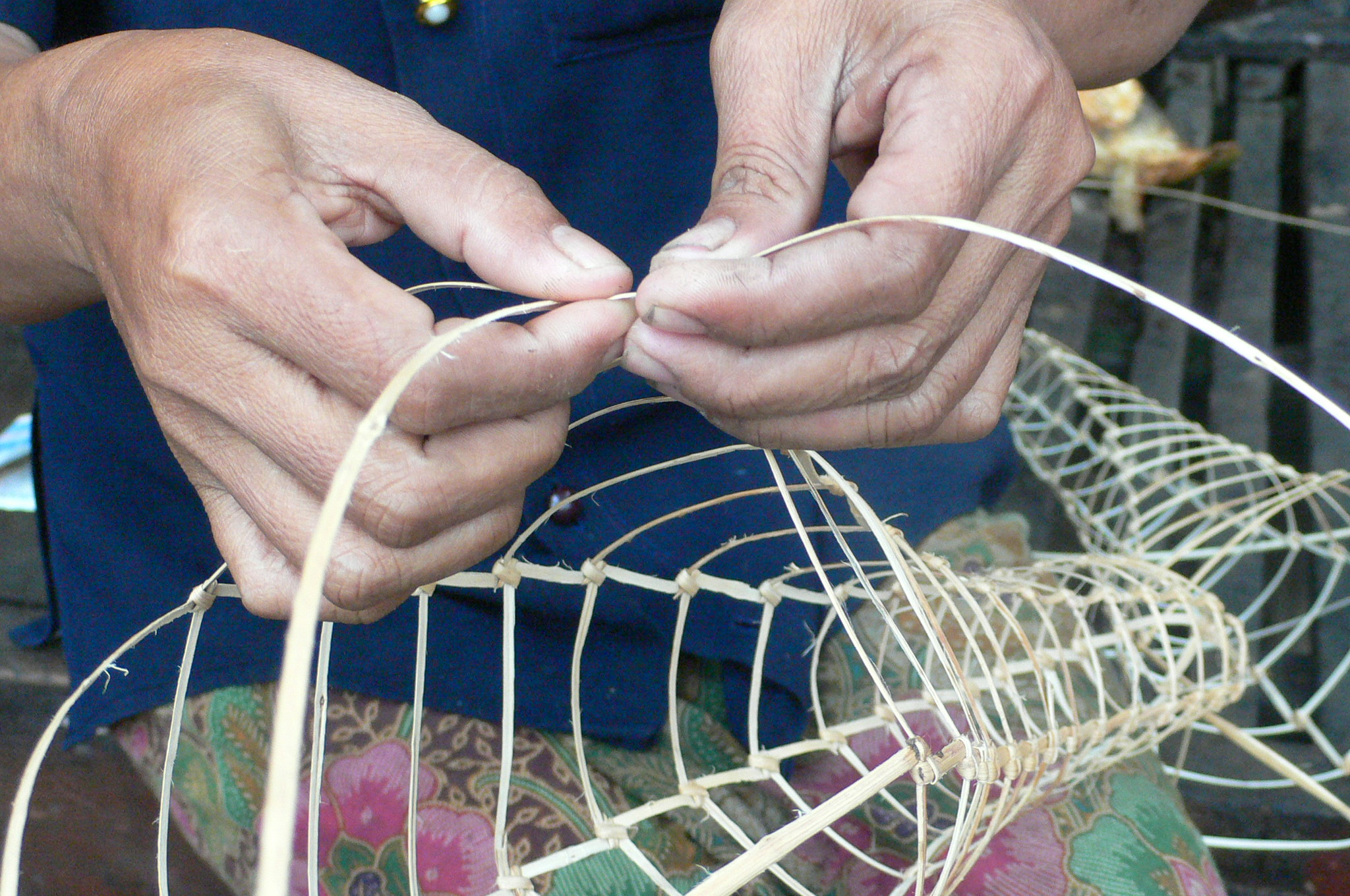

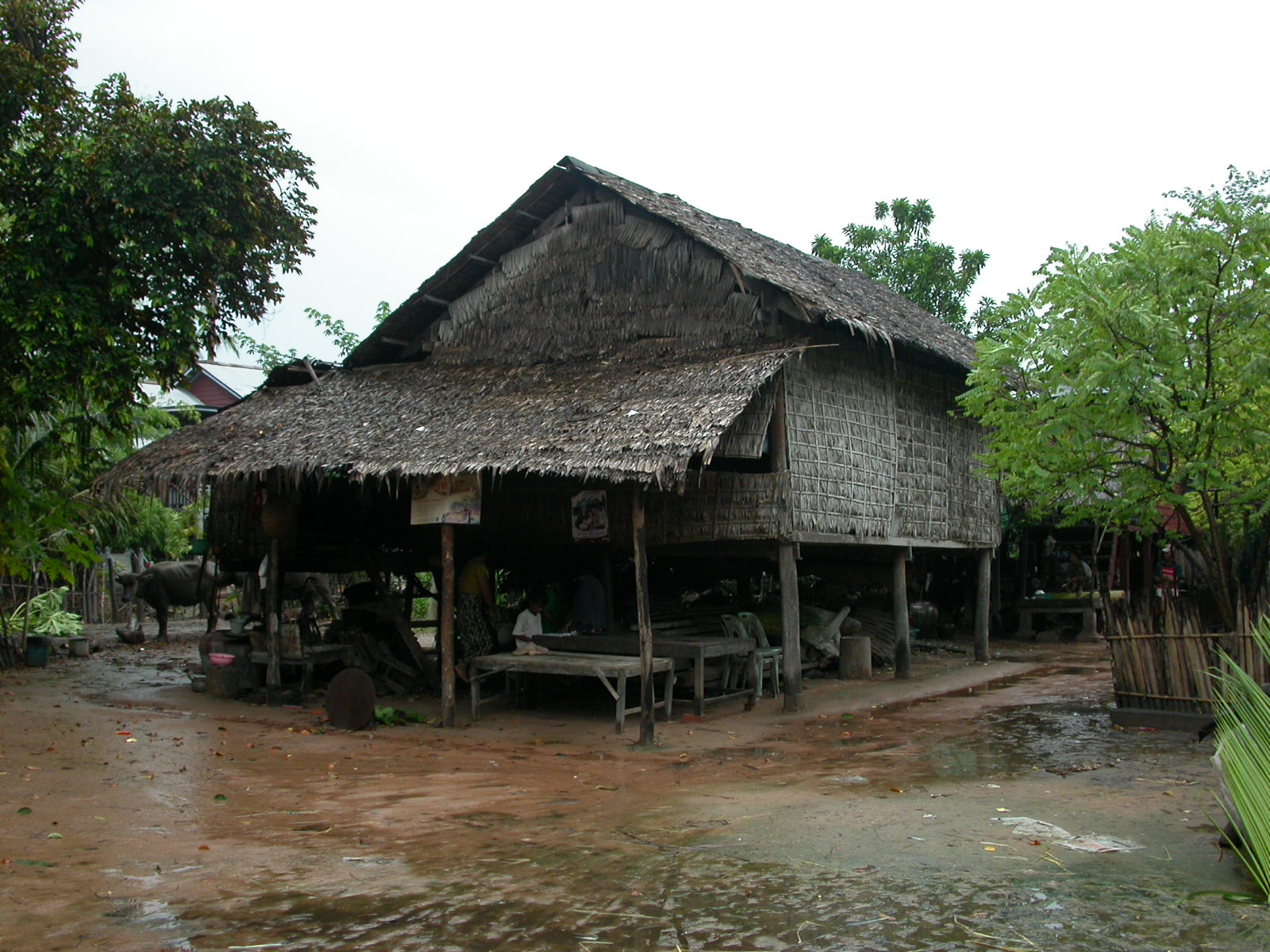

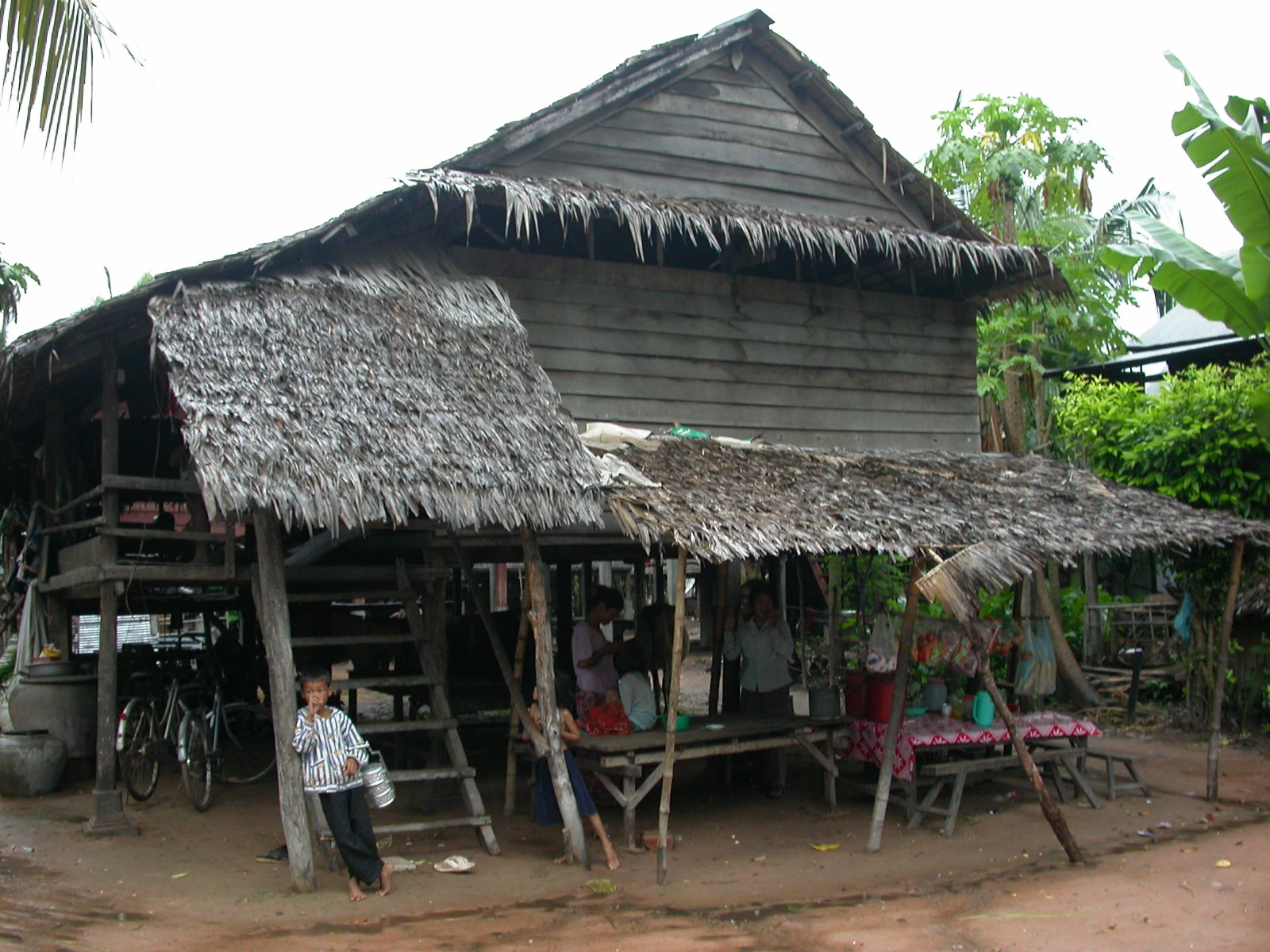

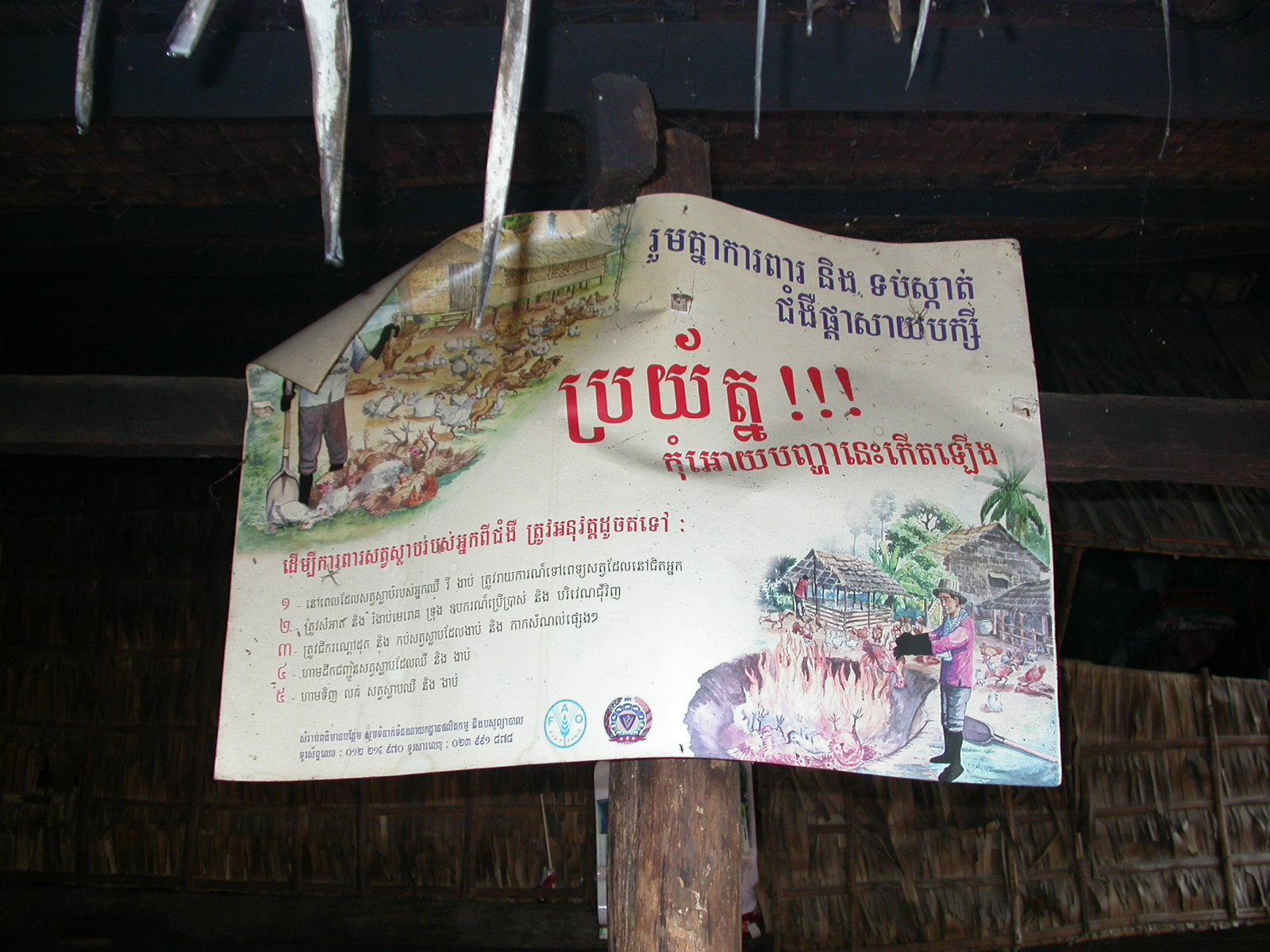

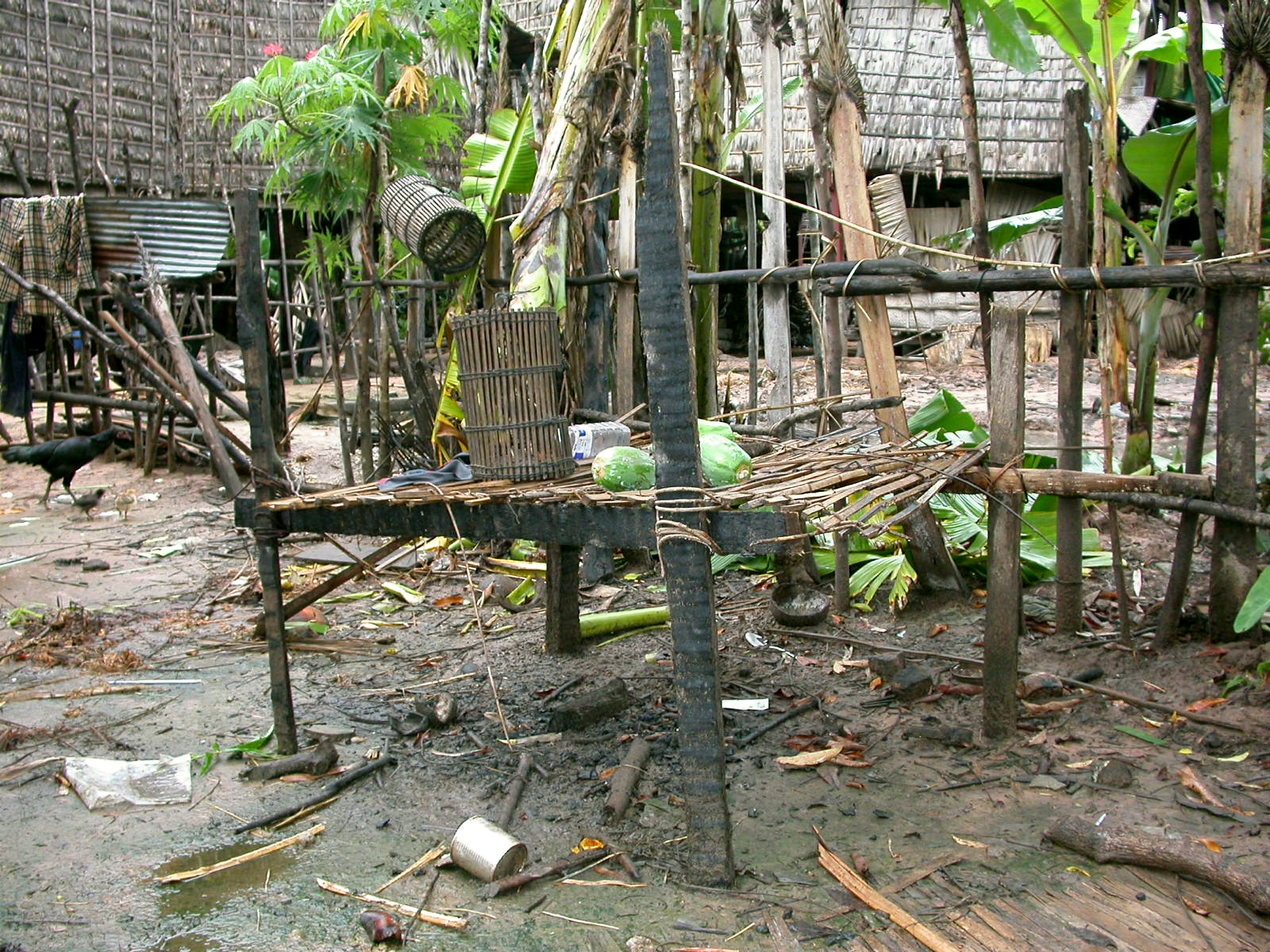

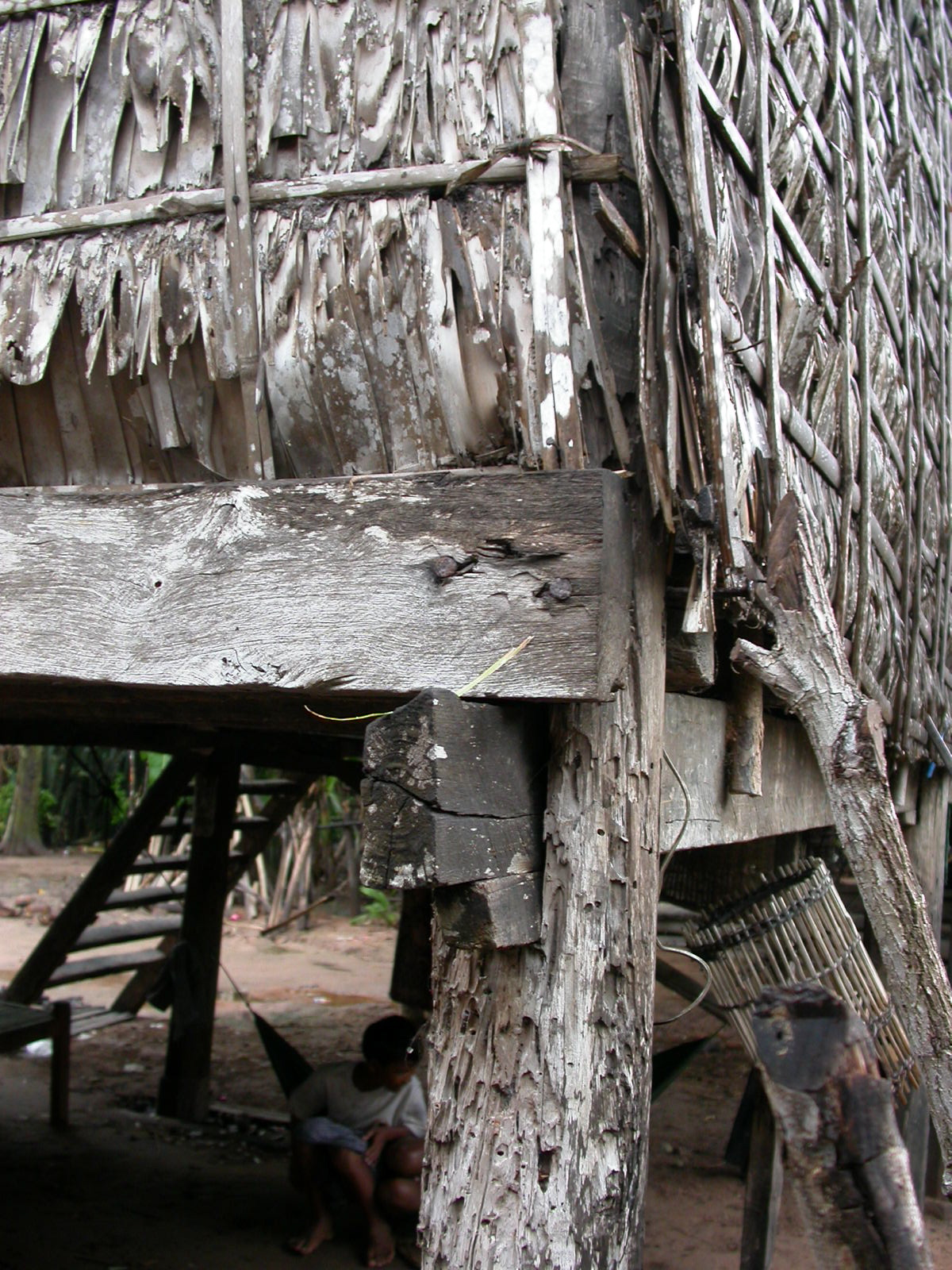

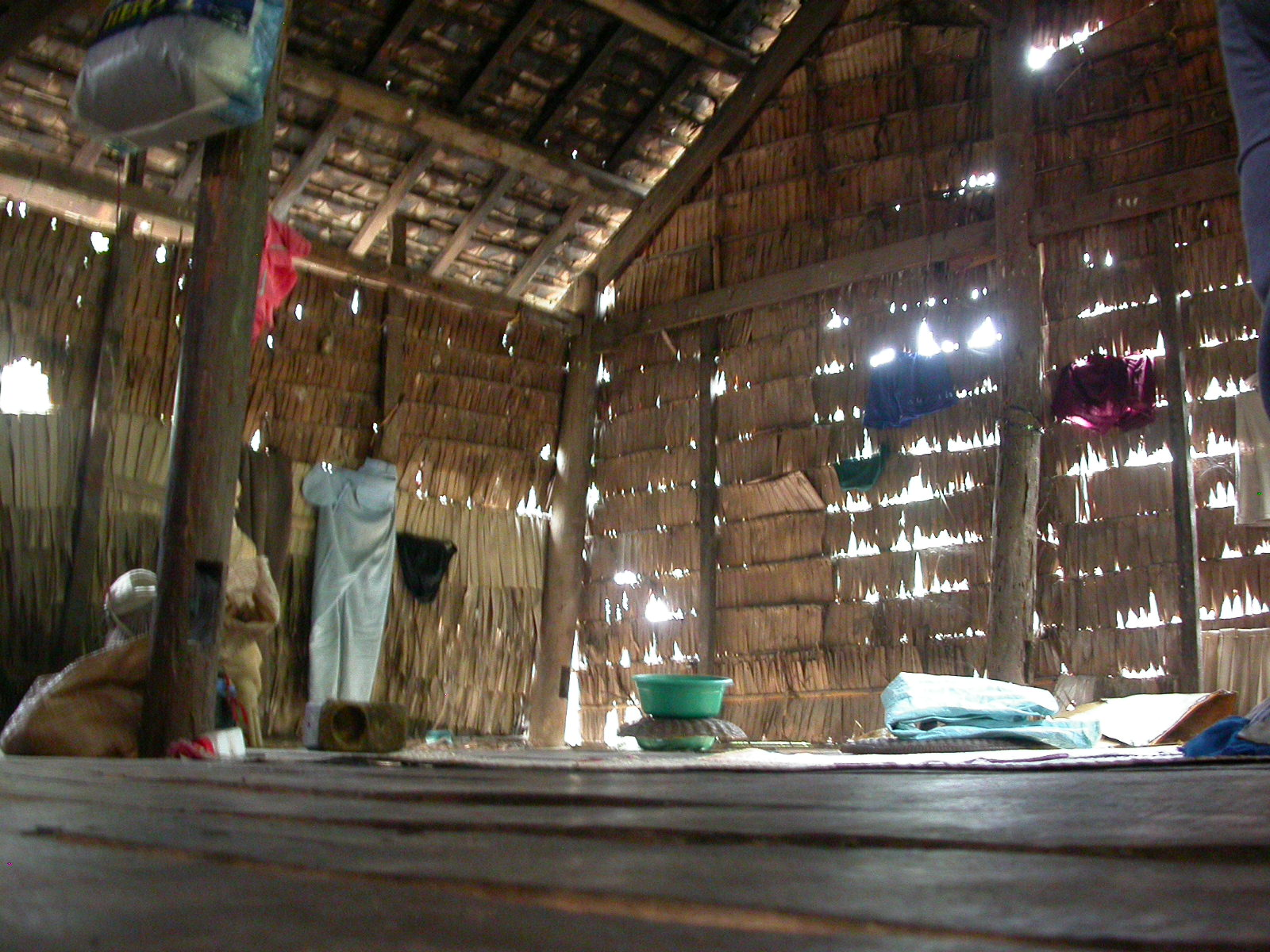

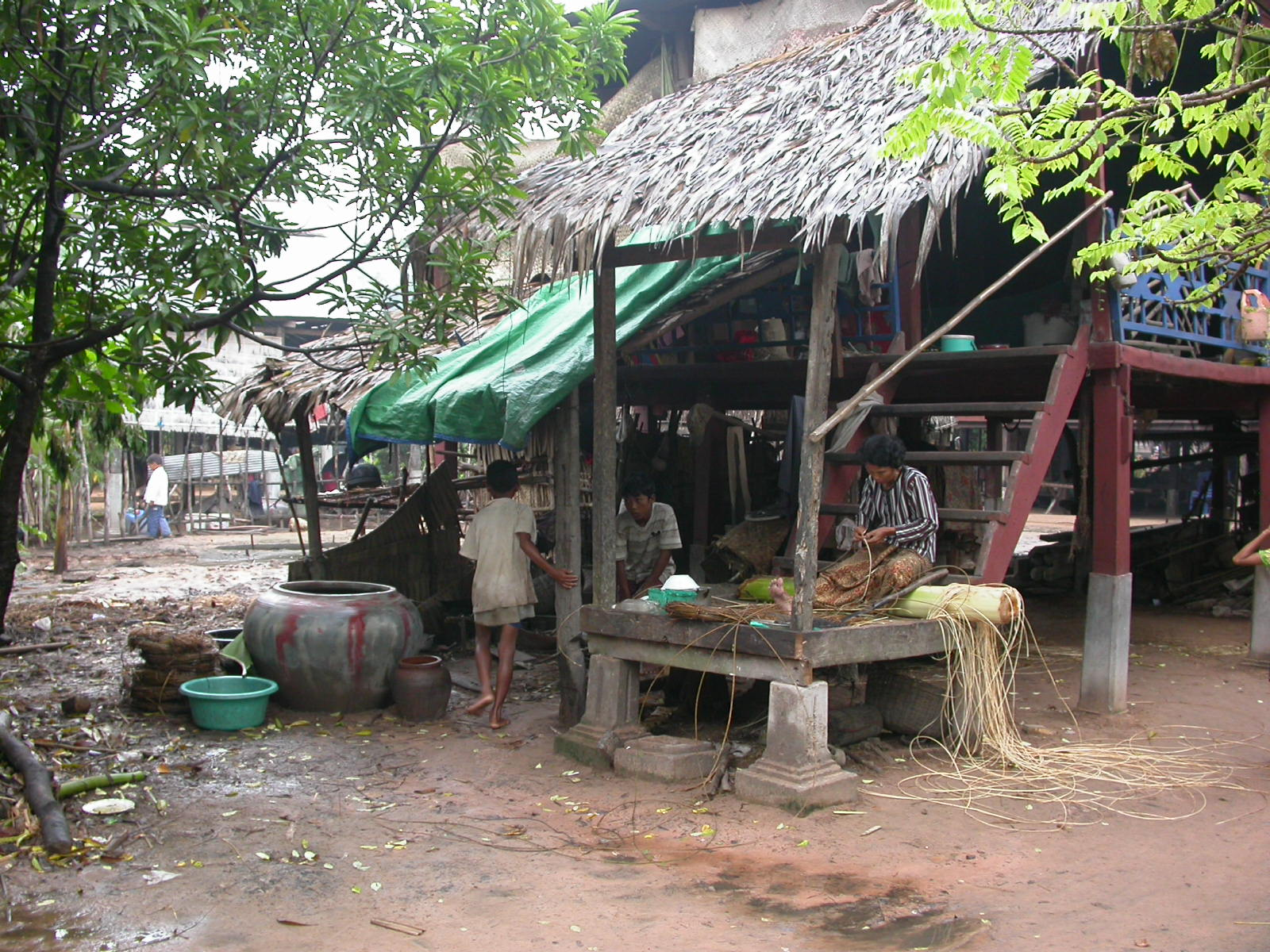

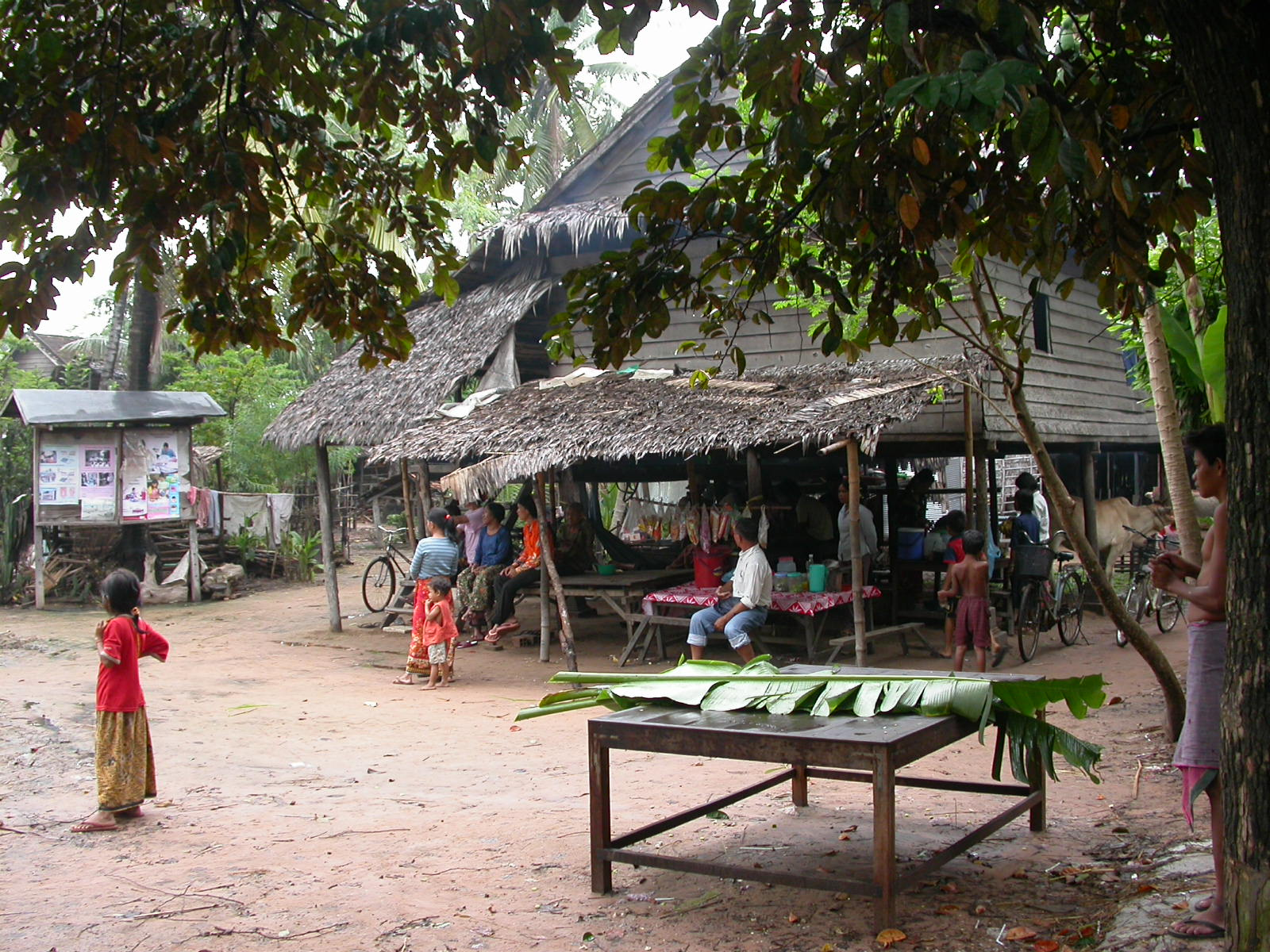

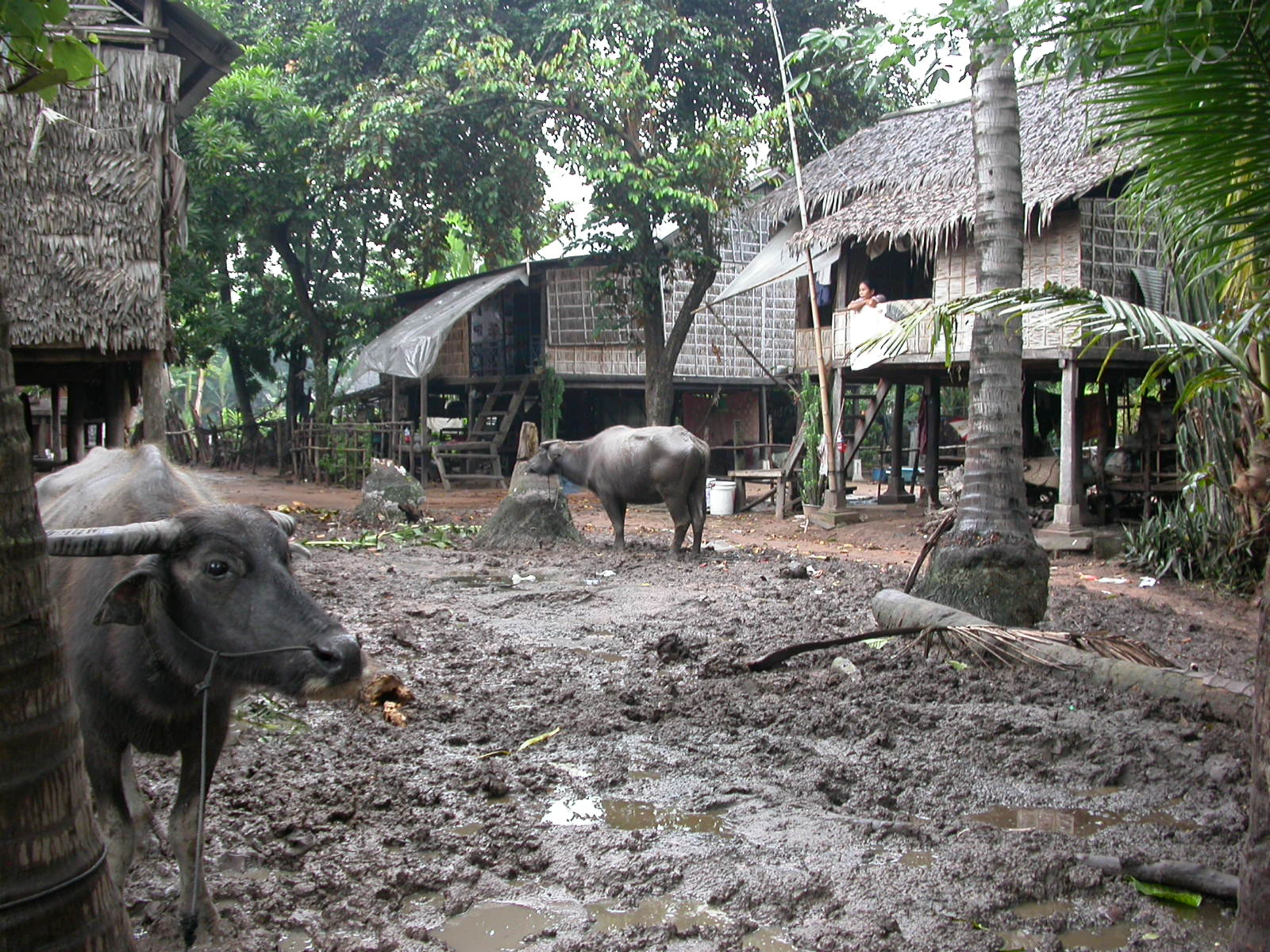

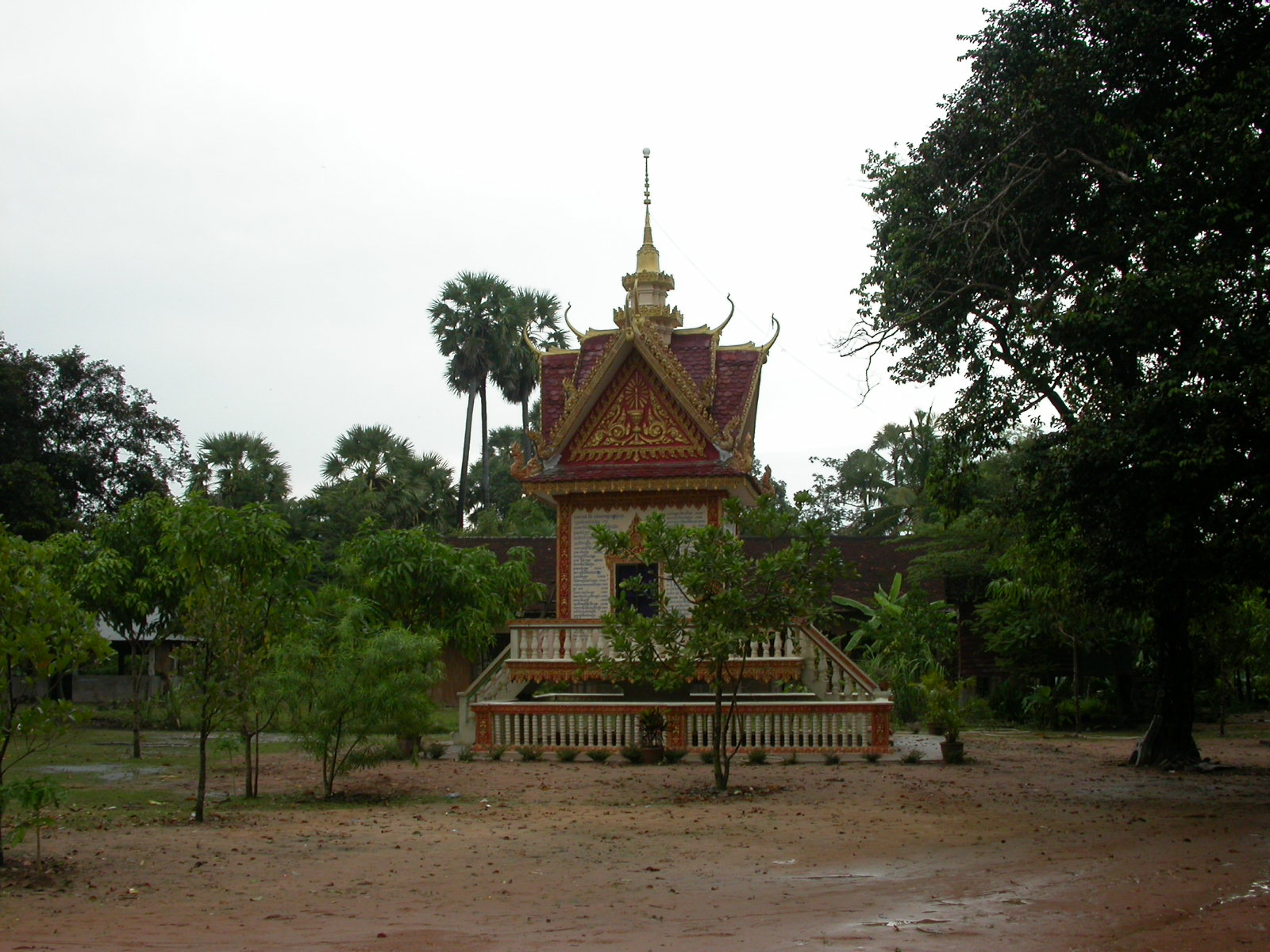

== Similar constructions outside Cambodia ==
In south-west China, Dong and Miao houses are built in a similar fashion to the Khmer house.

The Dong and Miao populations are both minority groups in China and are privileged. They most probably immigrated into China from Laos and north Thailand in pre-Christian times.

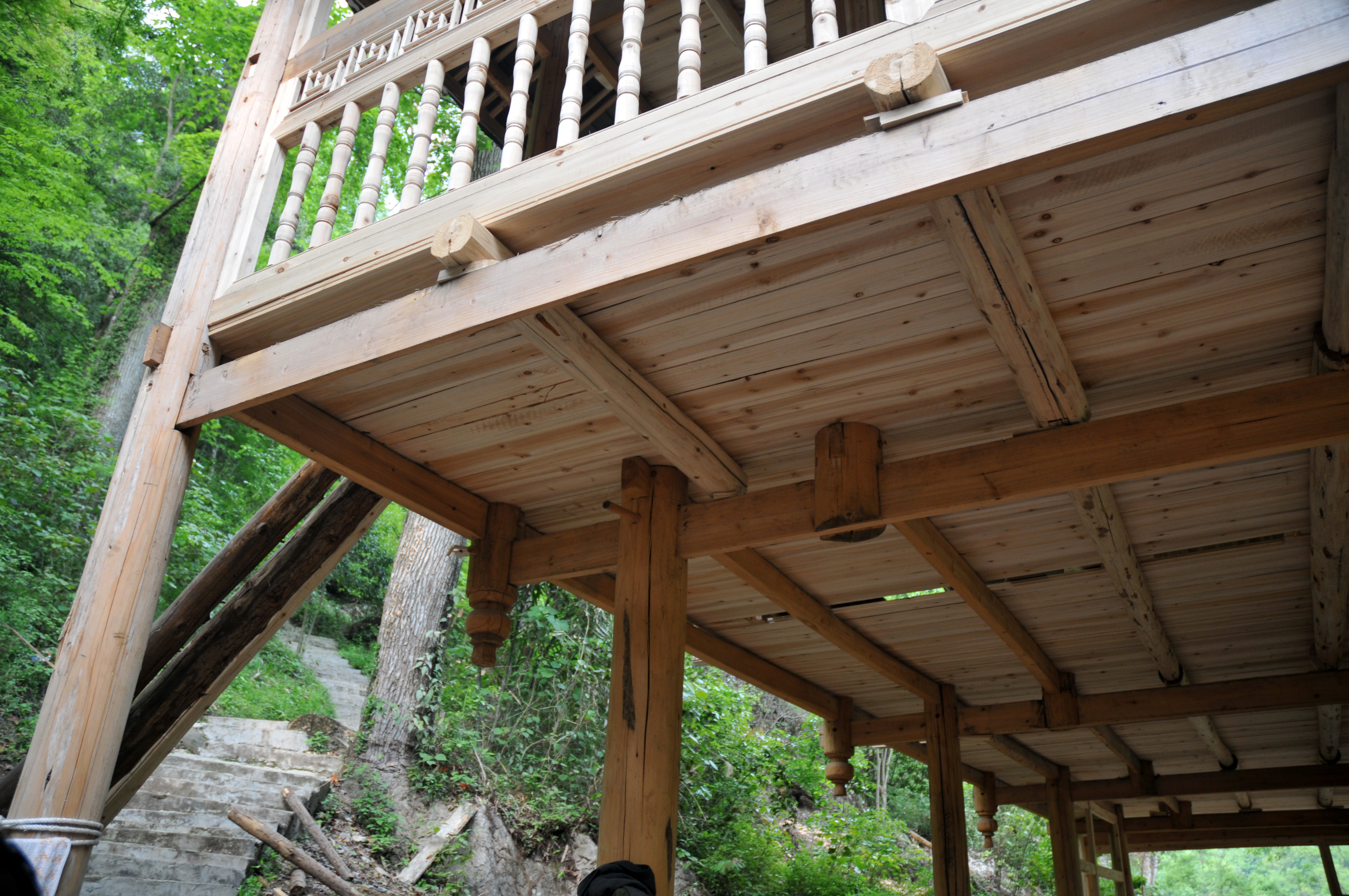

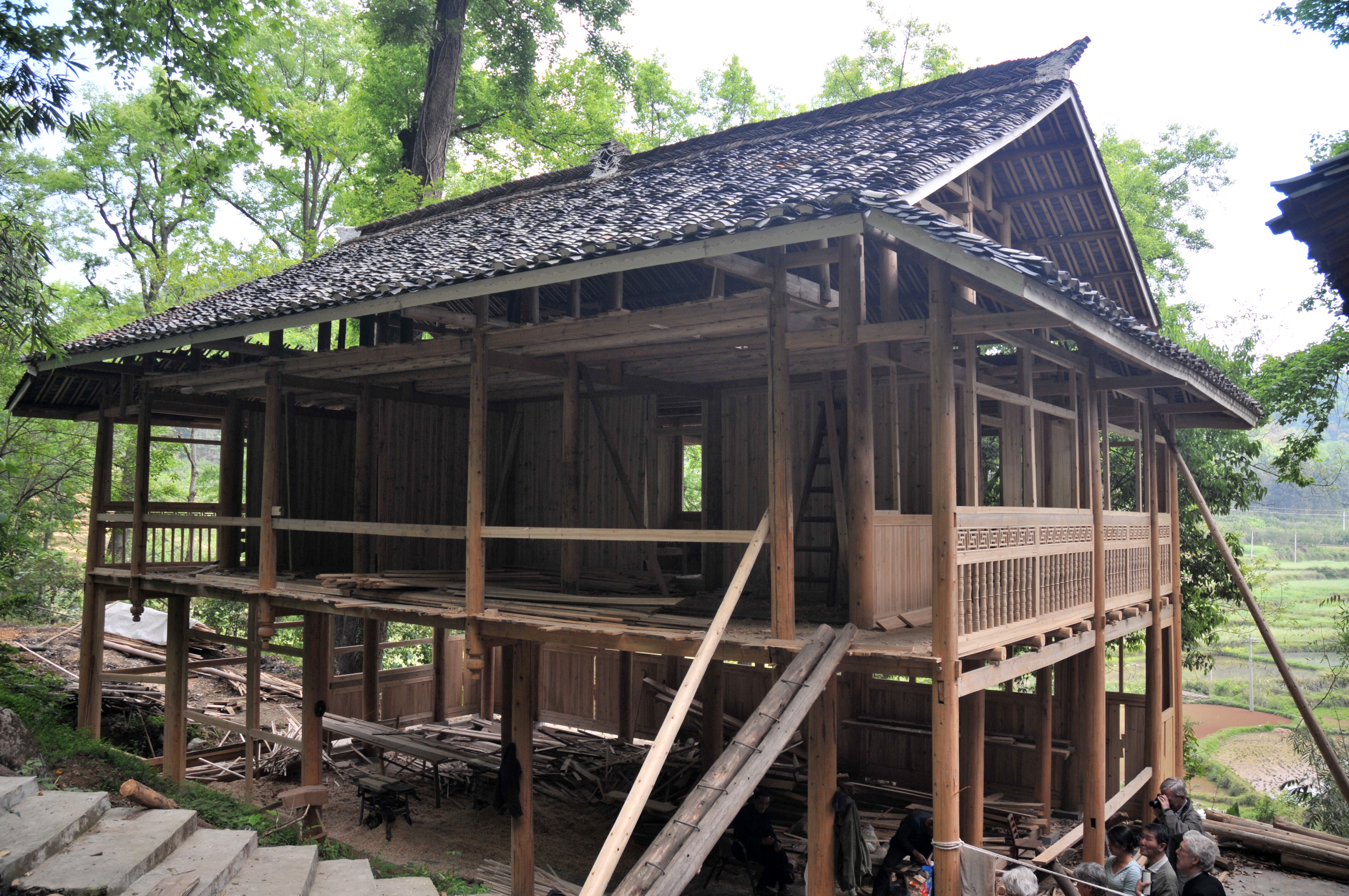

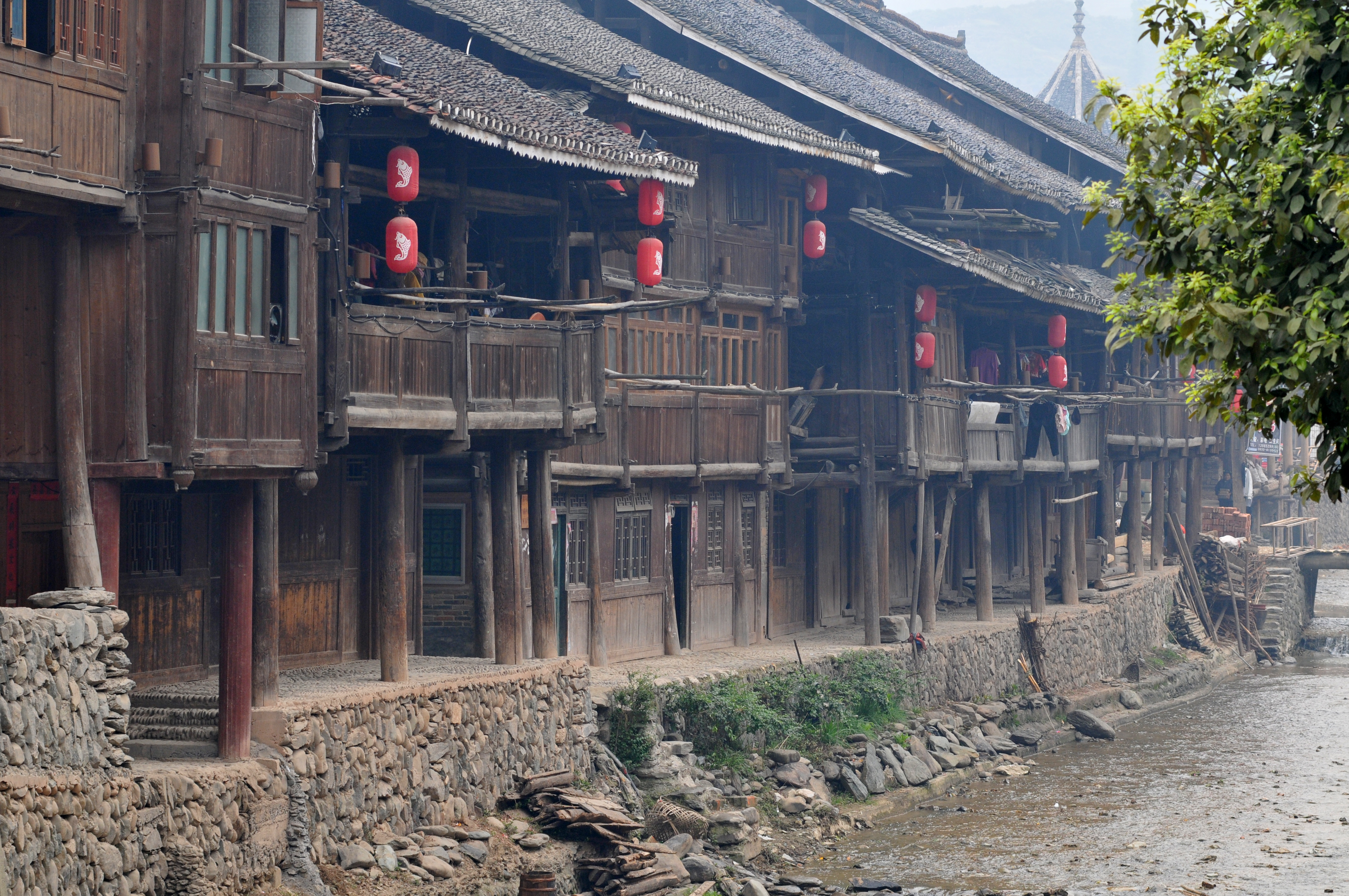

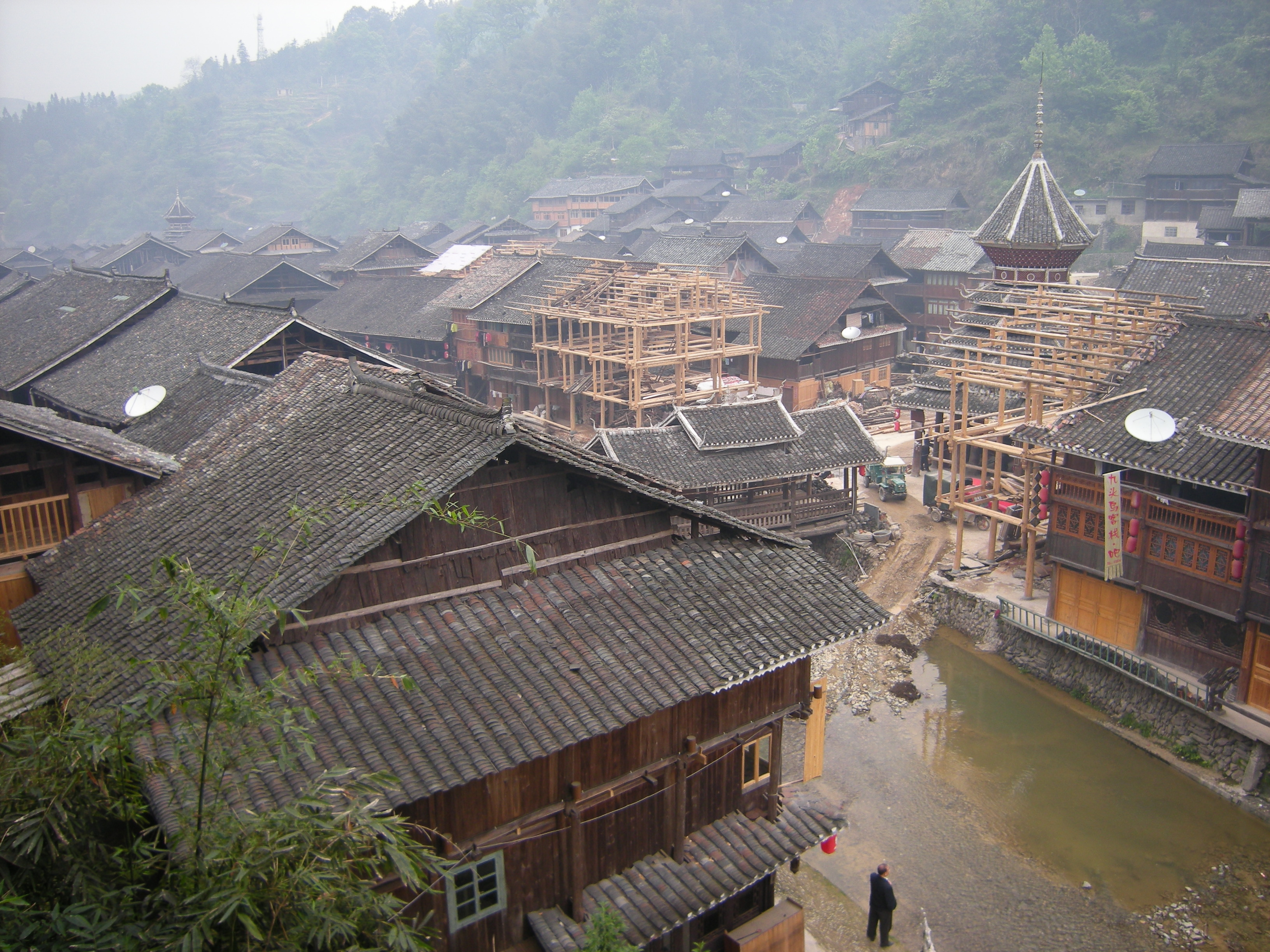

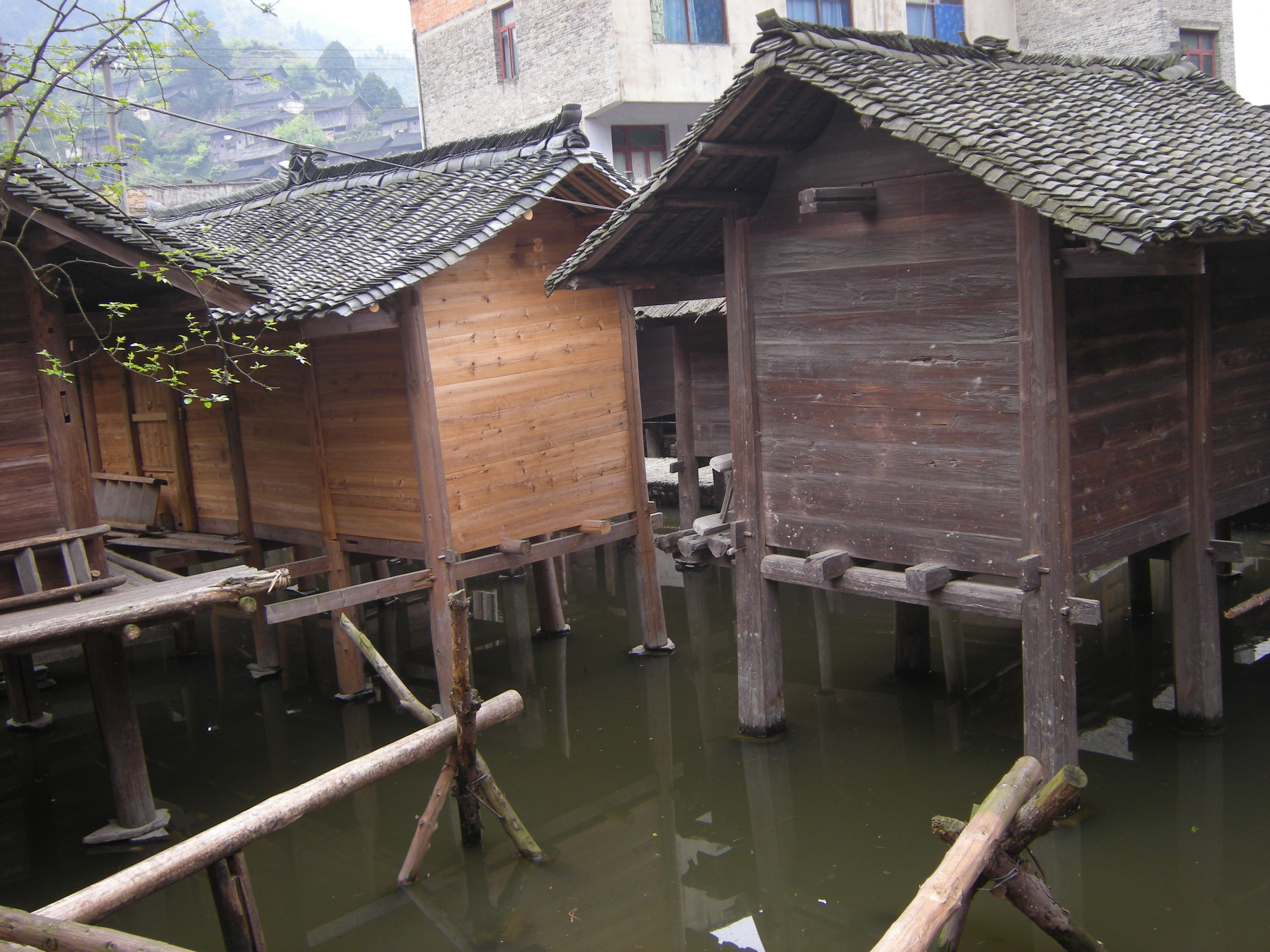

== See also ==
- Cambodia
- Architecture of Cambodia
- New Khmer Architecture
- Types of Khmer house
