= List of house types =

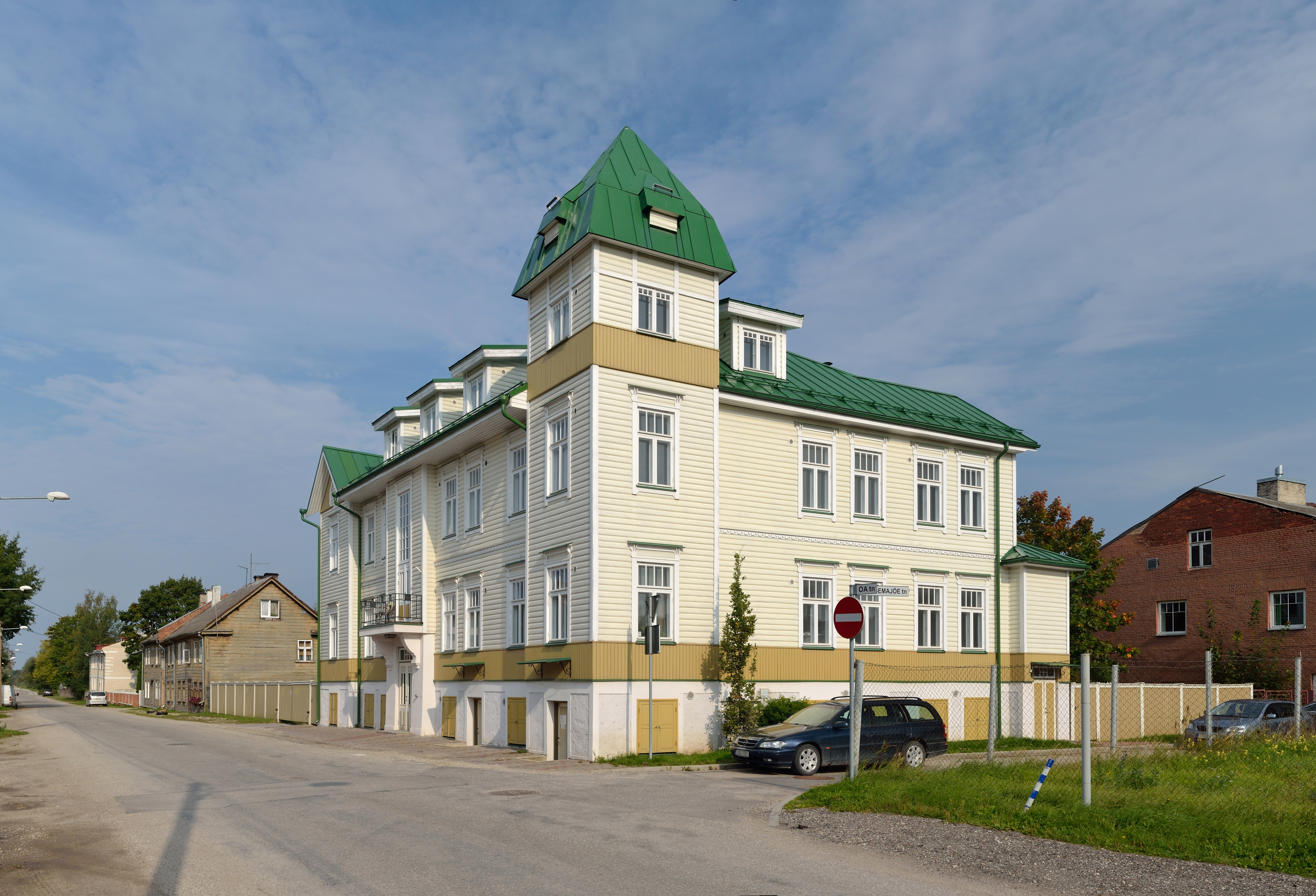
A wooden house in Tartu, Estonia

Houses can be built in a large variety of configurations. A basic division is between free-standing or single-family detached homes and various types of attached or multi-family residential dwellings. Both may vary greatly in scale and the amount of accommodation provided.

== By layout ==
House layouts represent common plans of house interiors.

- Single pen, single cell, or Hall house: house layouts that are one room deep, but may be more than one room.
- Wealden hall house: a type of vernacular medieval timber-framed yeoman's hall house traditional in the south east of England.
- Double pen or double cell: a two-room house.
  - Saddlebag: a two-room house with a central chimney and one or two front doors.
- Hall and parlor house: a two-room house, with one room (the hall) larger than the other (the parlor).
  - Central-passage or central hallway\corridor: a three-room house, with a central hallway or passage running front-to-back between the two rooms on either side of the house.
  - Dogtrot house: divided house with an open, roofed breezeway between the two sections.
- Double-pile house layouts are two rooms deep, and also may be more than one room wide.
  - Side-hall or side passage: a house with a hallway that runs from front to back along one side.

== Hut ==
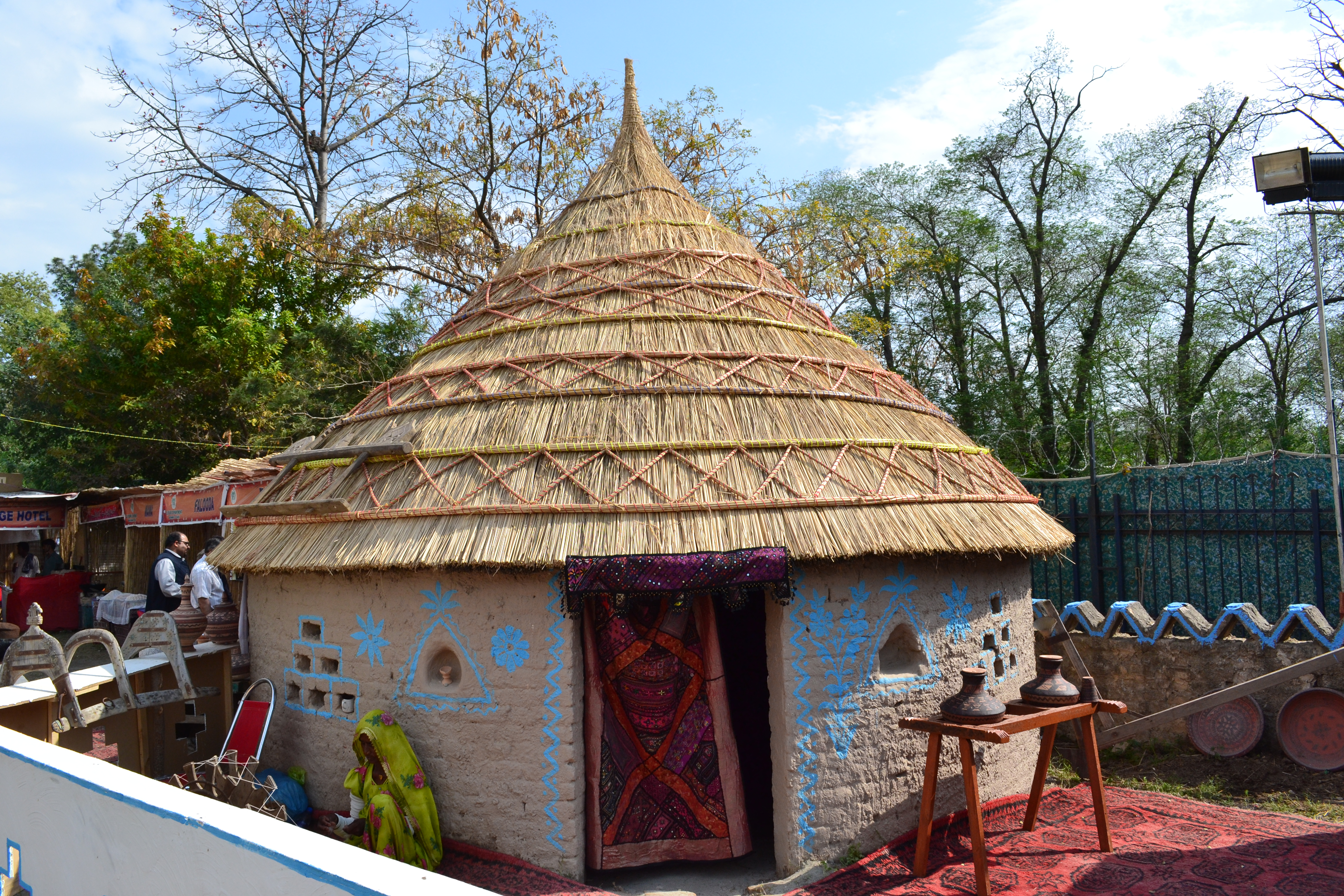
A hut in Tharparkar

A hut is a dwelling of relatively simple construction, usually one room and one story in height. The design and materials of huts vary widely around the world.

- Yurt: traditional huts of Nomadic tribes.
- Igloo: Inuit, Yup'ik, and Aleut seasonal or emergency shelter made of knife-sliced blocks of packed snow and/or ice in the Arctic regions of Alaska, Canada, Greenland, and Siberian Russia.
- Wigwam: semi-permanent domed dwelling formerly used by Native American tribes.

== Bungalow ==
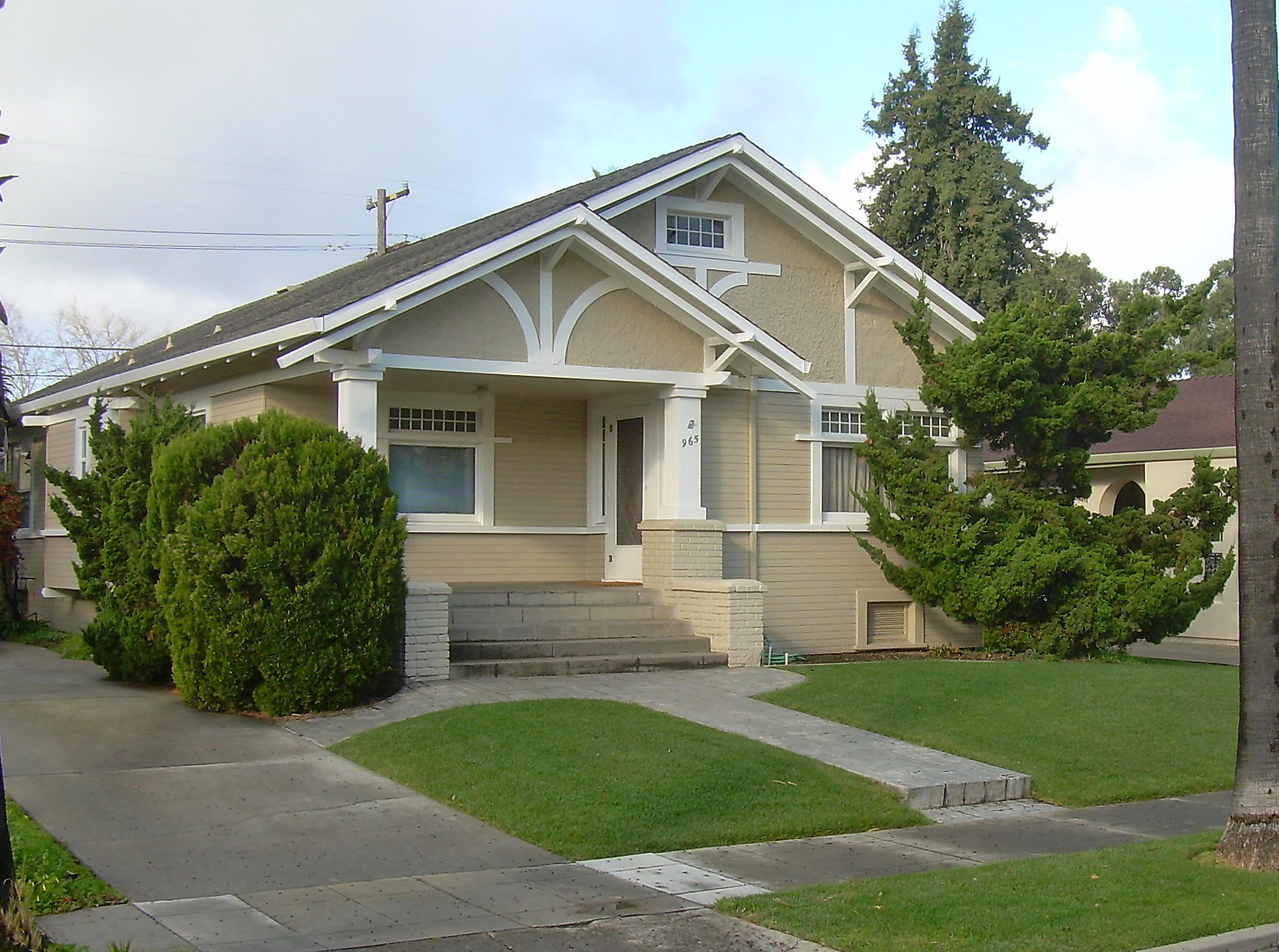
American Craftsman bungalow

Bungalow is a common term applied to a low one-story house with a shallow-pitched roof (in some locations, dormered varieties are referred to as 1.5-story, such as the chalet bungalow in the United Kingdom).

- Stilt house or Pile dwelling: houses raised on stilts over the surface of the body of water or the ground (usually in swampy areas prone to flooding).

== Cottage ==
A cottage is a small house, usually one or two stories in height, although the term is sometimes applied to larger structures.

- Summer house: non-primary residence in the countryside mostly for leasure and outdoor activities.

== Ranch ==
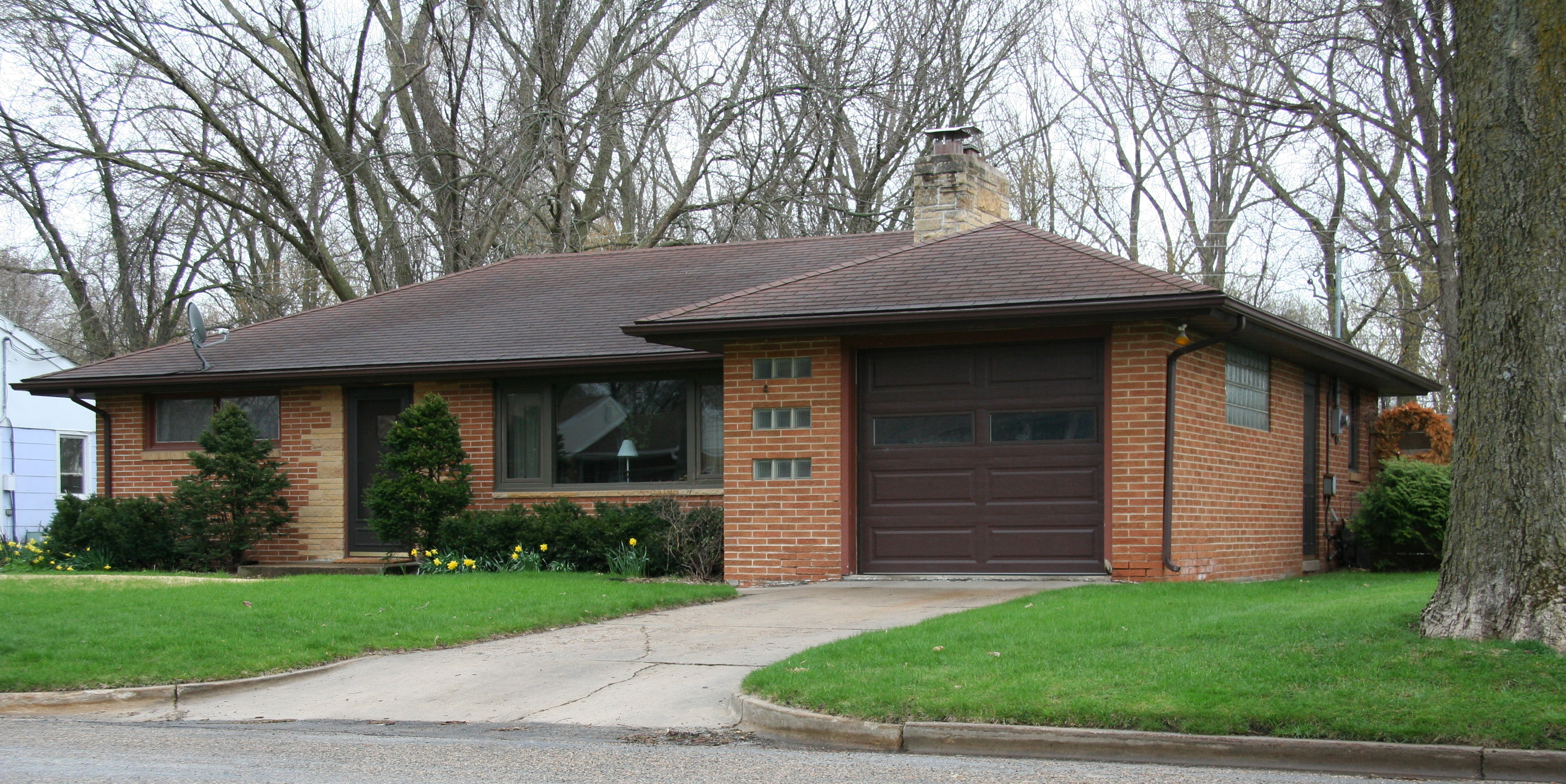
Brick ranch-style house

A ranch-style house or rambler is one-story, low to the ground, with a low-pitched roof, usually rectangular, L- or U-shaped with deep overhanging eaves. Ranch styles include:

- California ranch: the "original" ranch style, developed in the United States in the early 20th century, before World War II
- Tract ranch: a post-World War II style of ranch that was smaller and less ornate than the original, mass-produced in housing developments, usually without basements
- Suburban ranch: a modern style of ranch that retains many of the characteristics of the original but is larger, with modern amenities

== Gablefront ==
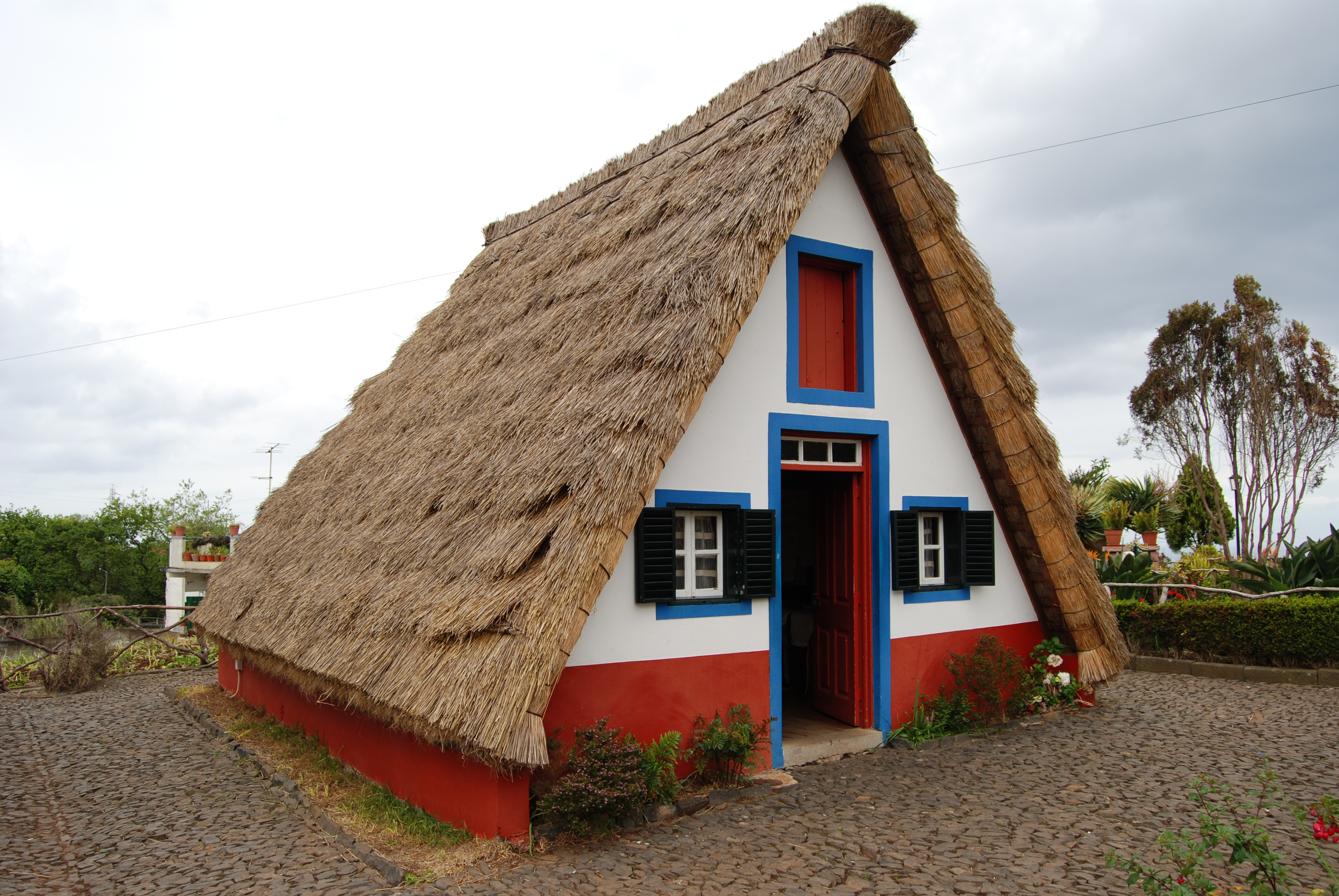
A-frame gable-style house, Portugal

A gablefront house or gablefront cottage has a gable roof that faces its street or avenue, as in the novel The House of Seven Gables.

- A-frame: so-called because the steep roofline, reaching to or near the ground, makes the gable ends resemble a capital letter A.
- Chalet: a gablefront house built into a mountainside with a wide sloping roof
- Charleston single house: originating in Charleston, South Carolina, a narrow house with its shoulder to the street and front door on the side.

== Split-level ==
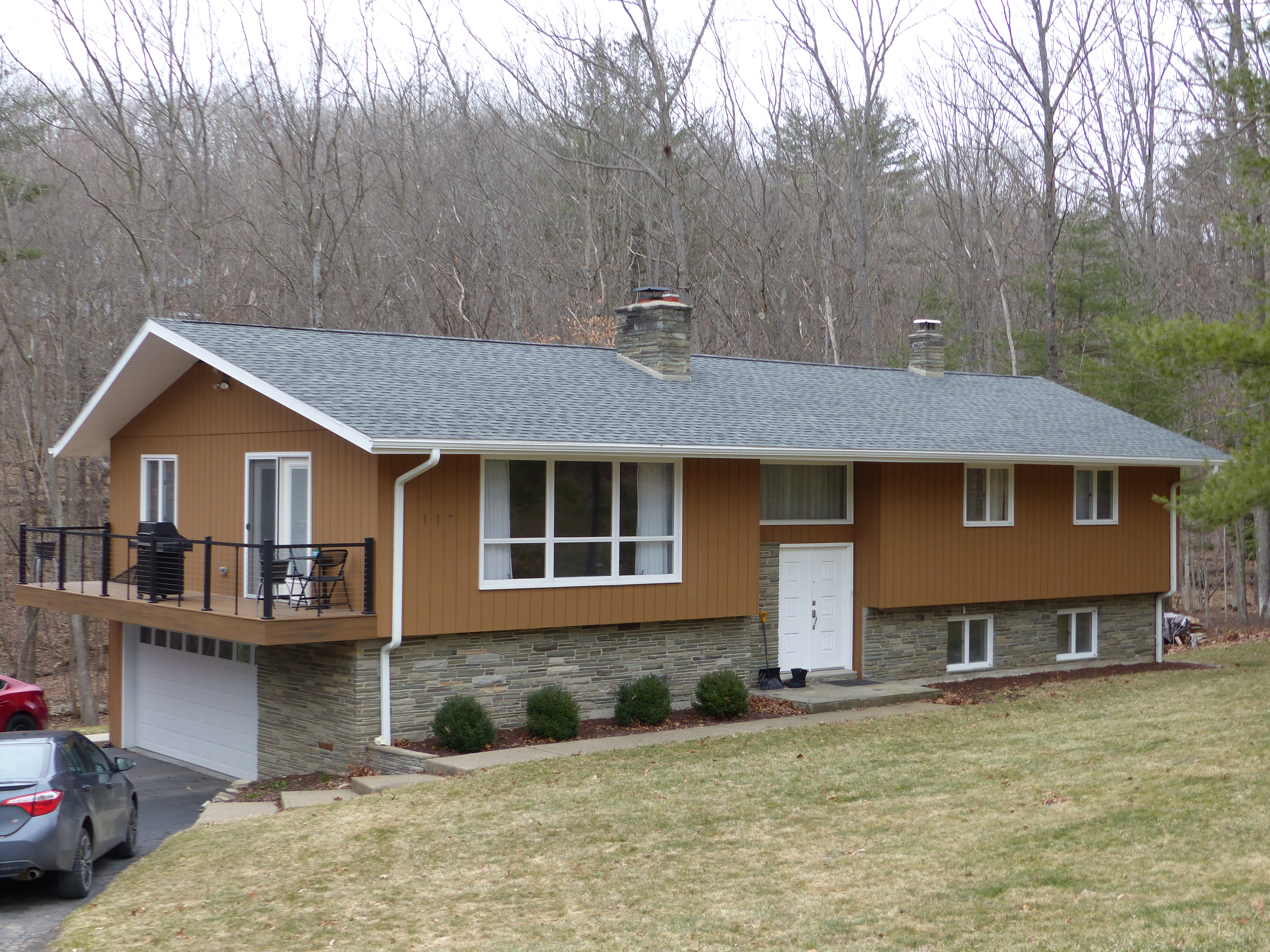
Split-level house

Split-level house is a design of house that was commonly built during the 1950s and 1960s. It has two nearly equal sections that are located on two different levels, with a short stairway in the corridor connecting them.

- Bi-level or raised ranch
- Tri-level, quad-level, quintlevel etc.

== Tower ==
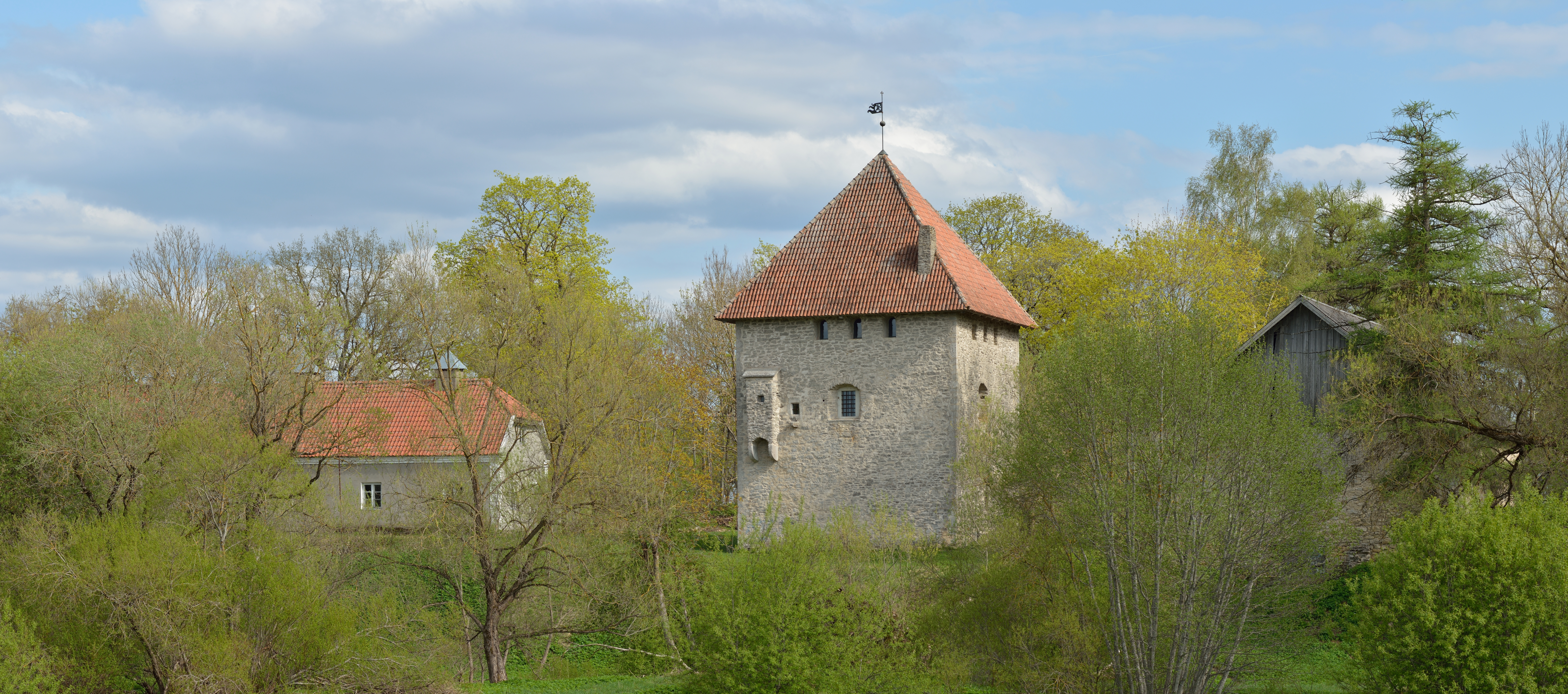
Vao tower house in Estonia, built in 15th century

A tower house is a compact two or more story house, often fortified.

- Irish tower houses were often surrounded by defensive walls called bawns
- Kulla: an Albanian tower house
- Peel tower or Pele tower: fortified tower houses in England and Scotland used as keeps or houses
- Vainakh tower: a tower house found in Chechenya and Ingushetia that reached up to four stories tall and were used for residential or military purposes, or both
- Welsh tower houses: built mostly in the 14th and 15th centuries

== Longhouse ==
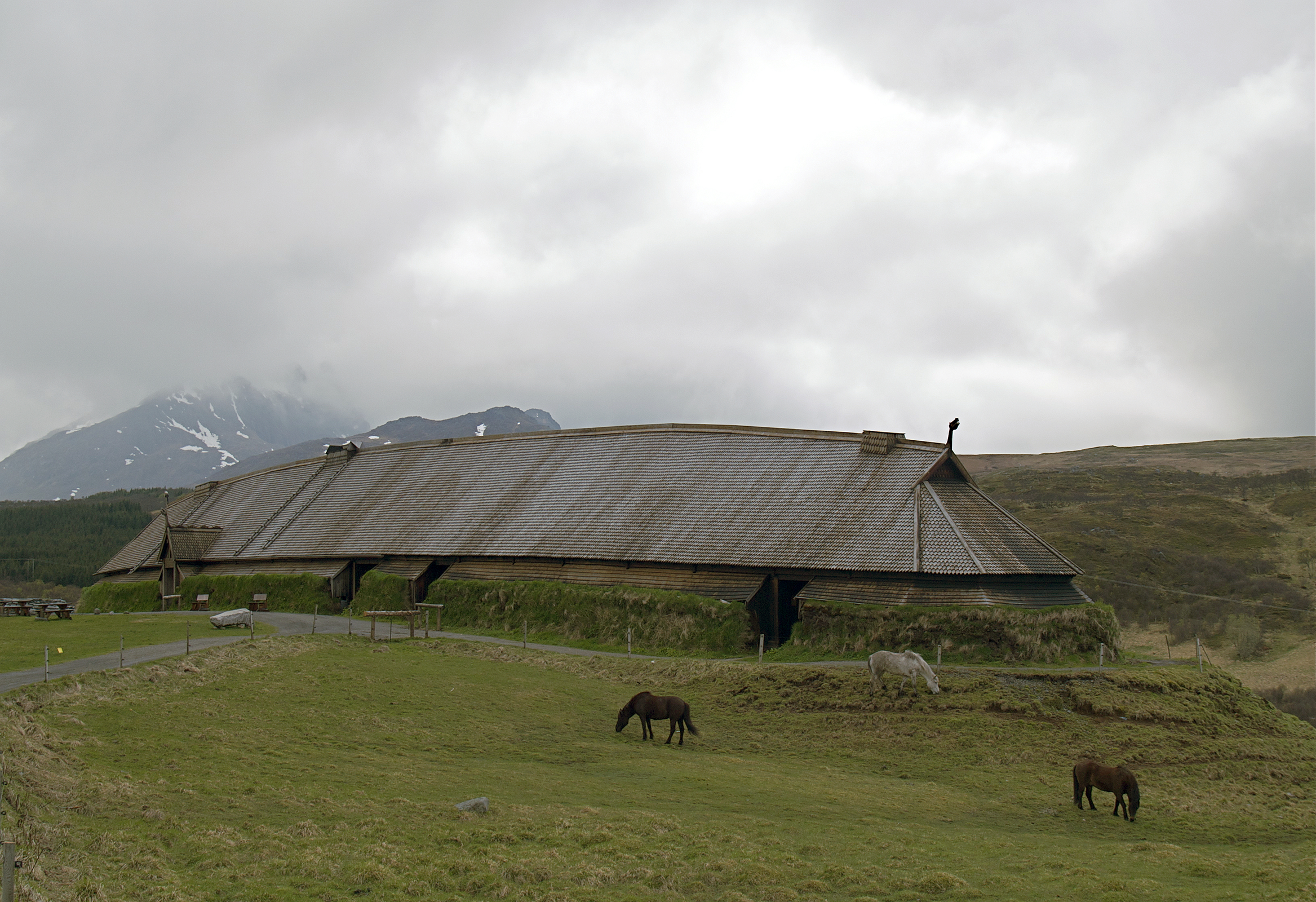
reconstructed Viking longhouse

A longhouse is historical house type typically for family groups.

- Geestharden house: one of the three basic house types in Schleswig-Holstein region of Germany
  - Uthland-Frisian house: a sub type of Geestharden house of northwest Germany and Denmark
- Longère: a long and narrow house in rural Normandy and Brittany

== Housebarn ==
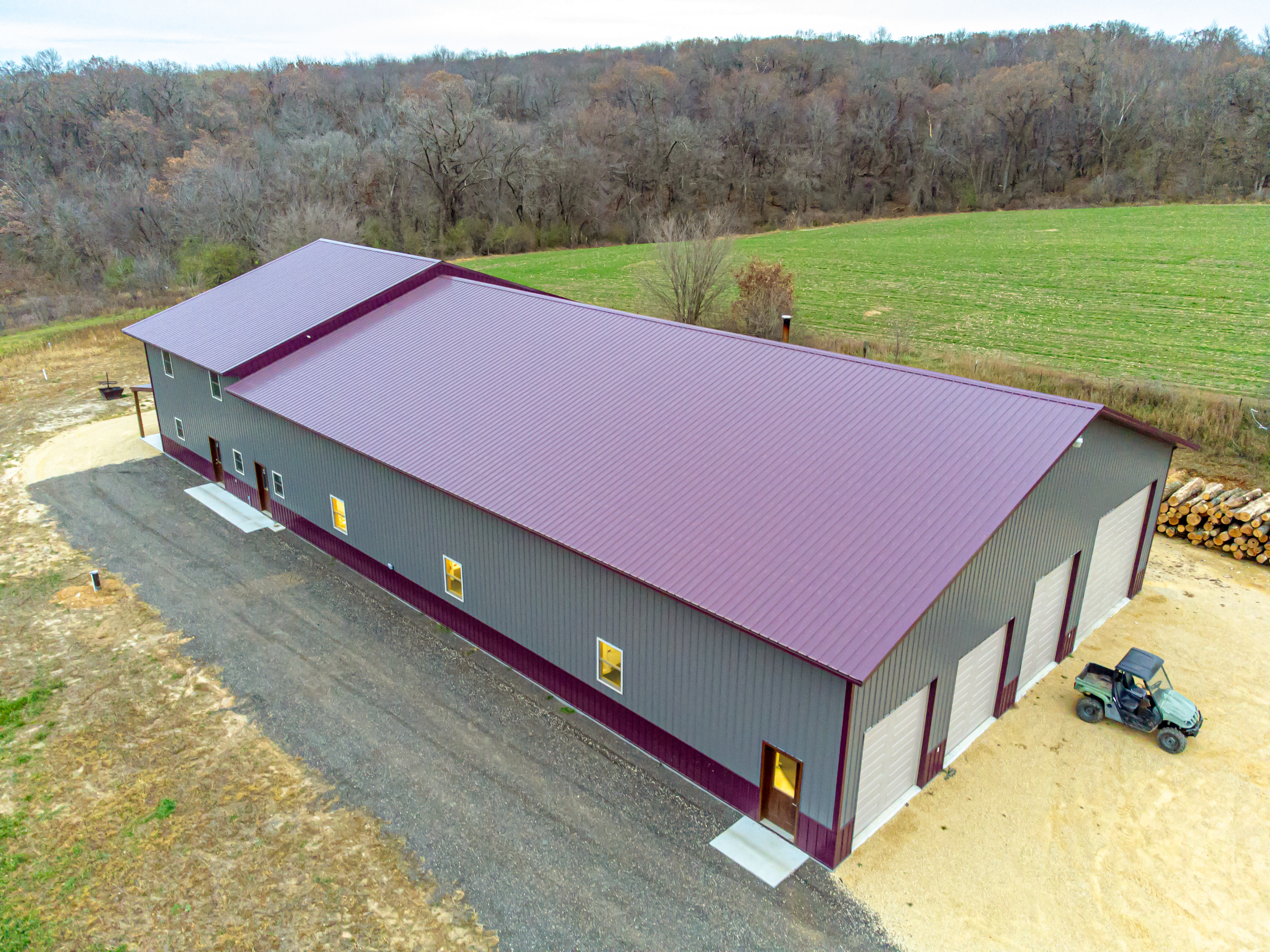
Post frame Barndominium with standing seam metal roof. Large garage on the front side and living space on the back end.

A housebarn is a combined house and barn.

- Barndominium: a type of house that includes living space attached to either a workshop or a barn, typically for horses, or a large vehicle such as a recreational vehicle or a large recreational boat
- Byre-dwelling: farmhouse with people and livestock under one roof
- Connected farm: type of farmhouse common in New England
- Frutighaus: a type of barnhouse originating in the Frutigland region of Switzerland.

== Other house types ==
- Courtyard house
  - Riad: a type of courtyard house found in Morocco
  - Siheyuan, Sanheyuan: a type of courtyard house found in China
- Dacha
- Holiday cottage
- Slope house: a house with soil or rock completely covering the bottom floor on one side and partly two of the walls on the bottom floor. The house has two entries depending on the ground level.
- Snout house: a house with the garage door being the closest part of the dwelling to the street.
- Octagon house: a house of symmetrical octagonal floor plan, popularized briefly during the 19th century by Orson Squire Fowler
- Villa: a large house which one might retreat to in the country. Villa can also refer to a freestanding comfortable-sized house, on a large block, generally found in the suburbs, and in Victorian terraced housing, a house larger than the average byelaw terraced house, often having double street frontage.
- Mansion: a very large, luxurious house, typically associated with exceptional wealth or aristocracy, usually of more than one story, on a very large block of land or estate.
  Mansions usually will have many more rooms and bedrooms than a typical single-family home, including specialty rooms, such as a library, study, conservatory, theater, greenhouse, infinity pool, bowling alley, or server room.
- Palace: the residence of a high ranking government official or the country's ruler.
- Castle: a heavily fortified medieval dwelling or a house styled after medieval castles. Usually with towers, crenellations, and a stone exterior.

== By construction method or materials ==
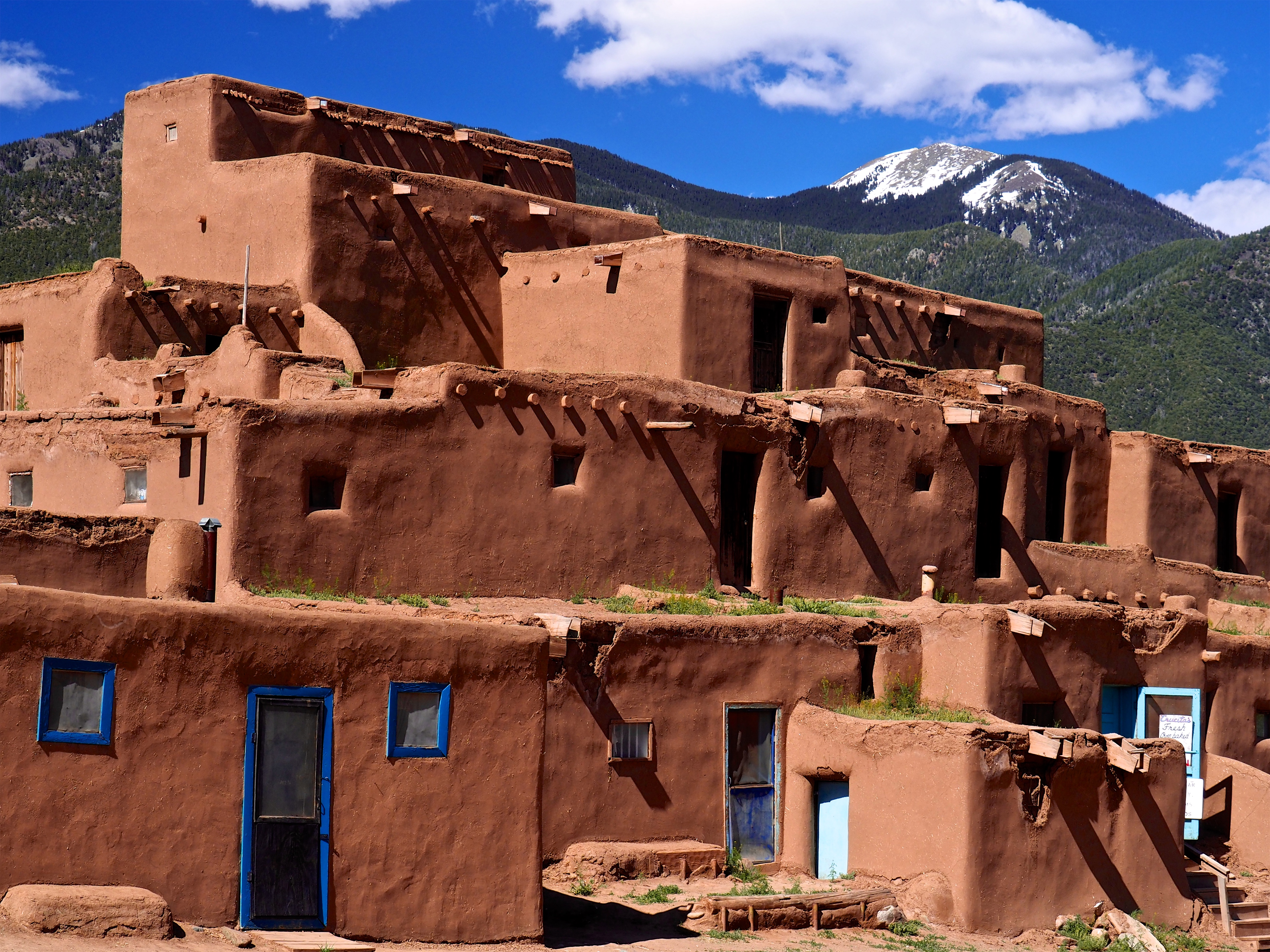
Multi-storied attached adobe houses at Taos Pueblo

- Airey house: a type of low-cost house that was developed in the United Kingdom during the 1940s by Sir Edwin Airey, and then widely constructed between 1945 and 1960 to provide housing for soldiers, sailors, and airmen who had returned home from World War II. These are recognizable by their precast concrete columns and by their walls made of precast "ship-lap" concrete panels.
- Assam-type House: an earthquake-resistant house type commonly found in the northeastern states of India
- Bastle house: a fortified farmhouse found in England and Scotland
- Converted barn: an old barn converted into a house or other use.
- Earth sheltered: houses using dirt ("earth") piled against it exterior walls for thermal mass, which reduces heat flow into or out of the house, maintaining a more steady indoor temperature
  - Pit-house: a prehistoric house type used on many continents and of many styles, partially sunken into the ground.
  - Rammed earth
  - Sod house
  - Earthbag home
  - Souterrain: an earthen dwelling typically deriving from Neolithic Age or Bronze Age times.
  - Underground home: a type of dwelling dug and constructed underground. Ex. A Rammed-Earth Style House
  - Yaodong: a dugout used as an abode or shelter in northern China, especially on the Loess Plateau
  - Wattle and daub
  - Adobe: a type of mudbrick house made of dirt and straw with mud used as mortar. Found throughout the world, in particular Spain, North Africa, the Middle East and the Americas.
- Kit house: a type of pre-fabricated house made of pre-cut, numbered pieces of lumber.
  - Sears Catalog Home: an owner-built "kit" houses that were sold by the Sears, Roebuck and Co. corporation via catalog orders from 1906 to 1940.
- Laneway house: a type of Canadian house that is constructed behind a normal single-family home that opens onto a back lane
- Log home, Log cabin: a house built by American, Canadian, and Russian frontiersmen and their families which was built of solid, unsquared wooden logs and later as a well crafted style of dwelling
- Plank house: a general term for houses built using planks in a variety of ways
- Pole house: a timber house in which a set of vertical poles carry the load of all of its suspended floors and roof, allowing all of its walls to be non-load-bearing.
- Prefabricated house: a house whose main structural sections were manufactured in a factory, and then transported to their final building site to be assembled upon a concrete foundation, which had to be poured locally.
  - Manufactured house: a prefabricated house that is assembled on the permanent site on which it will sit.
  - Modular home: a prefabricated house that consists of repeated sections called modules.
  - Lustron house: a type of prefabricated house
- Reefer container housing units
- Tree house: a house built among the branches or around the trunk of one or more mature trees and does not rest on the ground.
- Upper Lusatian house or Umgebinde: combined log and timber-frame construction in Germany-Czech Republic-Poland region
- Wimpey no-fines house: a low-cost semi-attached or terraced houses built in the United Kingdom from the 1940s onwards using concrete without fine aggregates ("no-fine")

== Single-family attached ==
- Two-family or duplex: two living units, either attached side by side and sharing a common wall (in some countries, called semi-detached) or stacked one atop the other (in some countries, called a double-decker)
- Three-family or triplex: three living units, either attached side by side and sharing common walls, or stacked (in some countries, called a three-decker or triple-decker)
- Four-family or quadplex or quad: four living units, typically with two units on the first floor and two on the second, or side-by-side
- Townhouse, terraced house, or rowhouse: common terms for single-family attached housing, whose precise meaning varies by location, often connecting a series of living units arranged side-by-side sharing common walls (not to be confused with the English term for an aristocratic mansion, townhouse (Great Britain))
  - Linked house: side-by-side attached houses that appear detached above-ground but are attached at the foundation below-ground
  - Linked semi-detached: side-by-side attached houses with garages in between them, sharing basement and garage walls
  - Mews property: an urban stable-block that has often been converted into residential properties. The houses may have been converted into ground floor garages with a small flat above which used to house the ostler or just a garage with no living quarters.
  - Patio house: townhouses that share a patio
- Weavers' cottage: townhouses with attached workshops for weavers

== Single-family detached ==
=== America ===
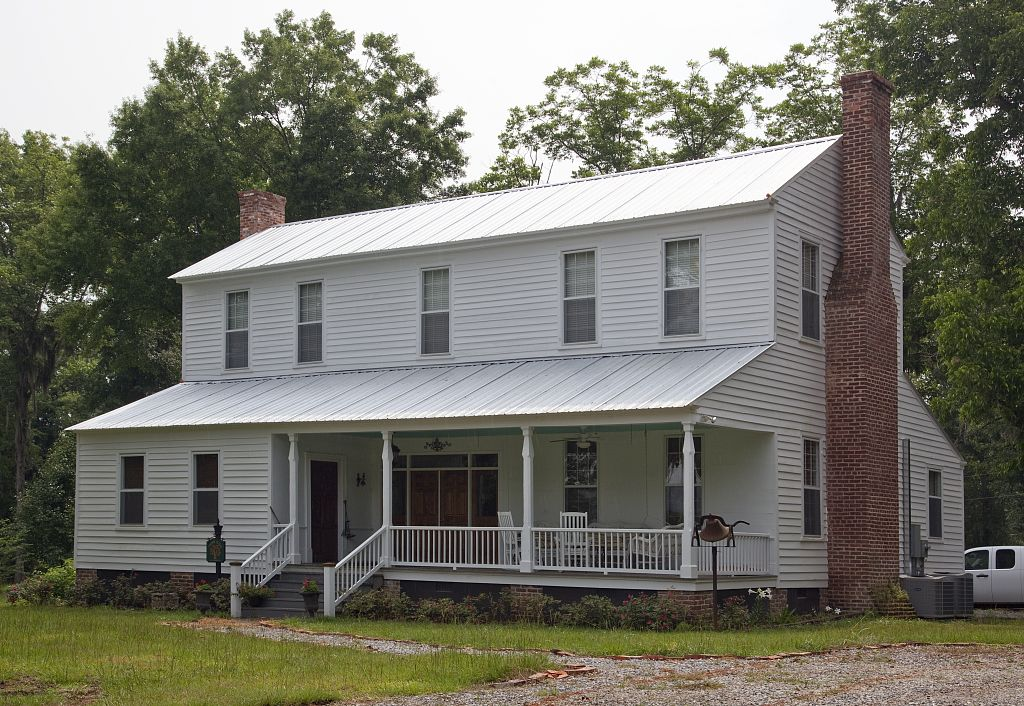
Southern I-House style home

- American Foursquare: symmetrical two-story house with hip roof popular in USA during 1890's-1930's.
- I-house: two or three-story house that is one room deep with a double-pen, hall-parlor, central-hall or saddlebag layout.
  - New England I-house: characterized by a central chimney
  - Pennsylvania I-house: characterized by internal gable-end chimneys at the interior of either side of the house
  - Southern I-house: characterized by external gable-end chimneys on the exterior of either side of the house
- Saltbox house or Catslide roof: type of house that originated in New England states of USA, characterized by unequal sides and long, low rear roofline.
- Shotgun house: a house that is one room wide and two rooms deep, without a corridor.
- Upright and Wing: a type originating in New England (particularly Upstate New York) and the Great Lakes states, usually of a Greek Revival style.

=== Europe ===
- Šumperák: Modernist type fo house popular Czech Republic.
- Rintamamiestalo: popular in Finland type of mass-produced private housing (Tyyppitalo), built from 1930s to 1950s.

== Movable dwellings ==
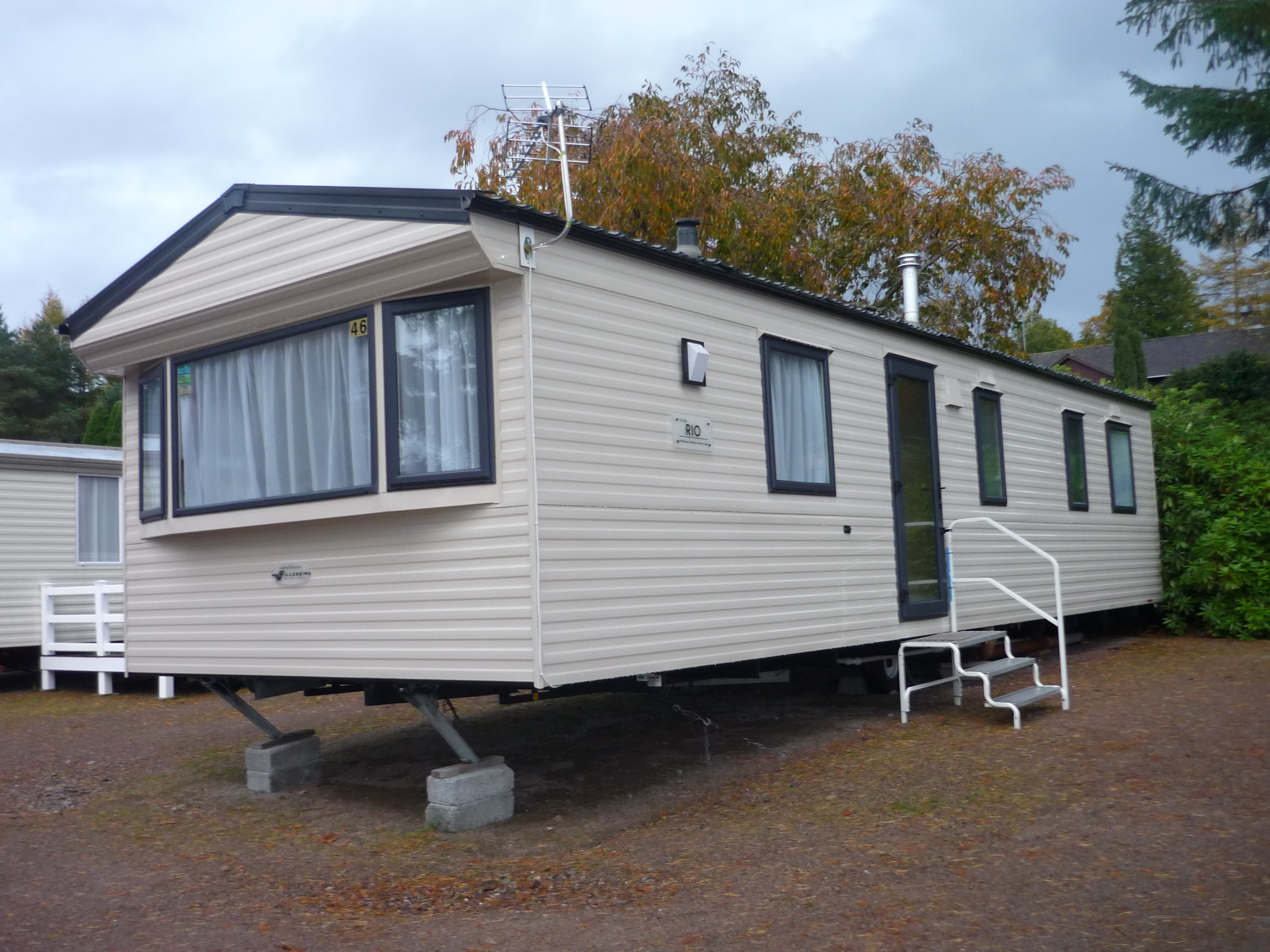
Mobile home

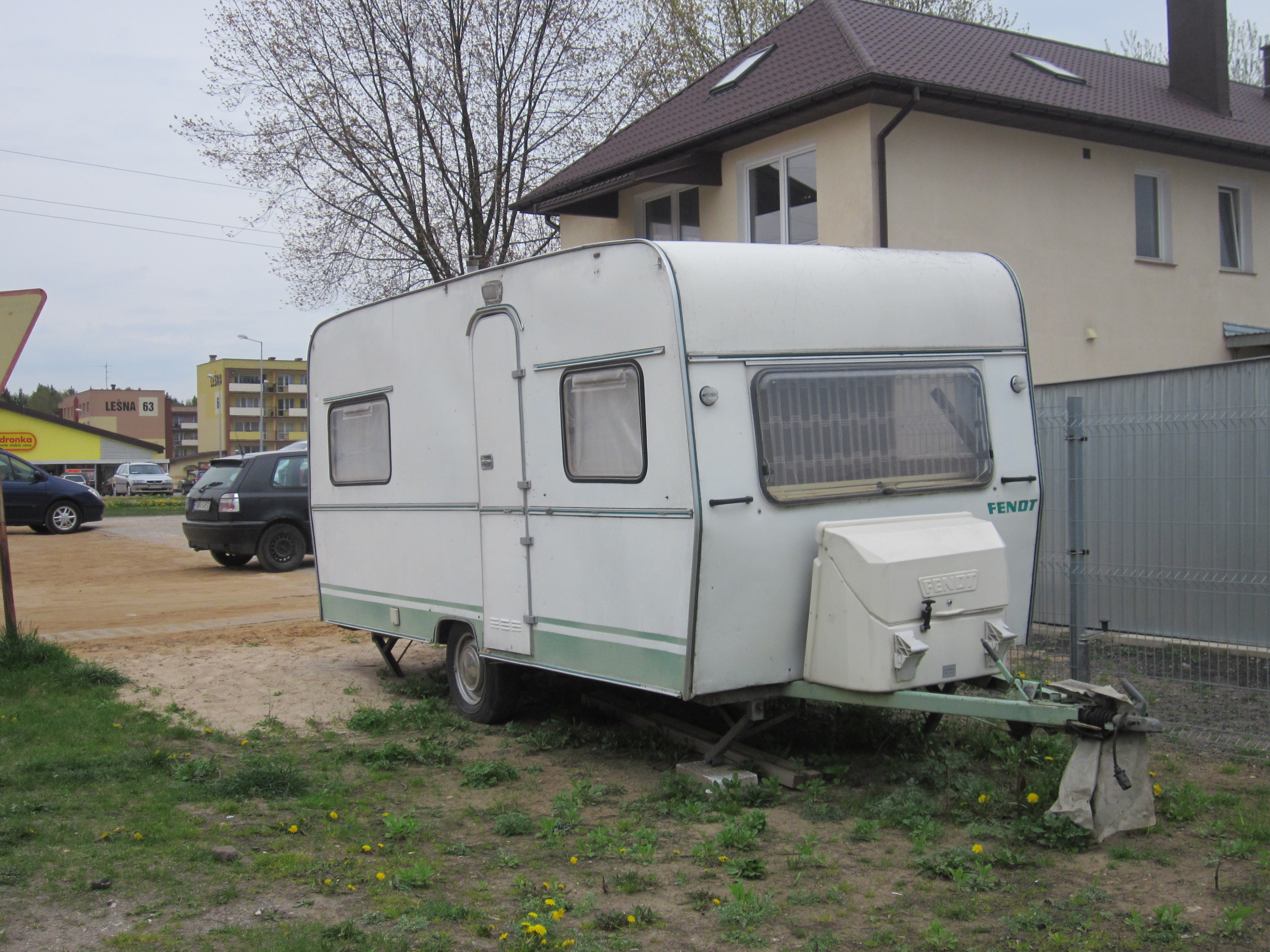
Travel trailer or camper

- Chattel house: a small wooden house occupied by working-class people on Barbados. Originally relocatable; personal chattel (property) rather than fixed real property.
- Construction trailer: temporary shelter used for workers at construction sites, outdoor events and hard-to-reach areas, that is easy to transport as a trailer or a cargo.
- Mobile home, park home, or trailer home: a prefabricated house that is manufactured off-site and moved by trailer to its final location (but not intended to be towed regularly by a vehicle)
- Recreational vehicle or RV: a motor vehicle or trailer that can be used for habitation
  - Travel trailer, camper or caravan: a trailer designed to be used as a residence (usually temporarily), which must be towed regularly by a vehicle and cannot move under its own power
  - Tiny house: a dwelling, usually built on a trailer or barge, that is 500 square feet (46 m^{2}) or smaller, built to look like a small house and suitable for long-term habitation
- Houseboat includes float houses: a boat designed to be primarily used as a residence
- Tent: a temporary, movable dwelling usually constructed with fabric covering a frame of lightweight wood or other locally available material
  - Tipi: a conical tent originating in North America
  - Yurt: a round tent with a conical roof originating in Central Asia

== Shared dwellings ==
Used to house big numbers people, usually in same rooms.

- Barracks: is a shared dwelling used to house mostly workers or soldiers.
- Garrison: Early American colonial era barracks for troops found in New England.

== See also ==
- Cohousing
- Company town
- City block
- Home
- House
- Gated community
- Intentional community
- List of house styles
- Outbuilding
- Planned unit development
- Real estate
- Spite house, which may or may not be attached to other structures
- Sustainable design
- Timeshare, form of vacation property
- Total institution
