= Šumperák =

Type of house

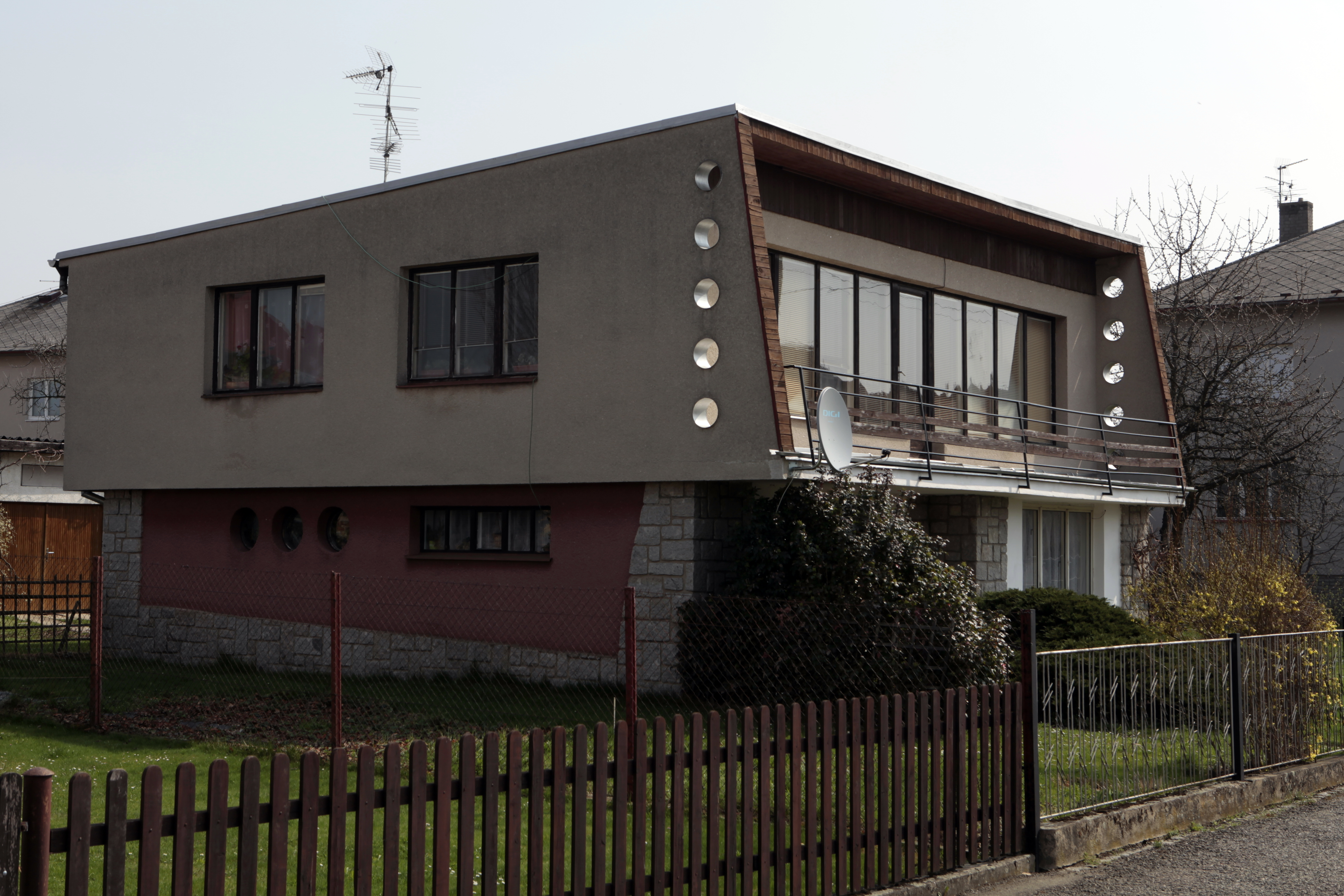
Šumperák

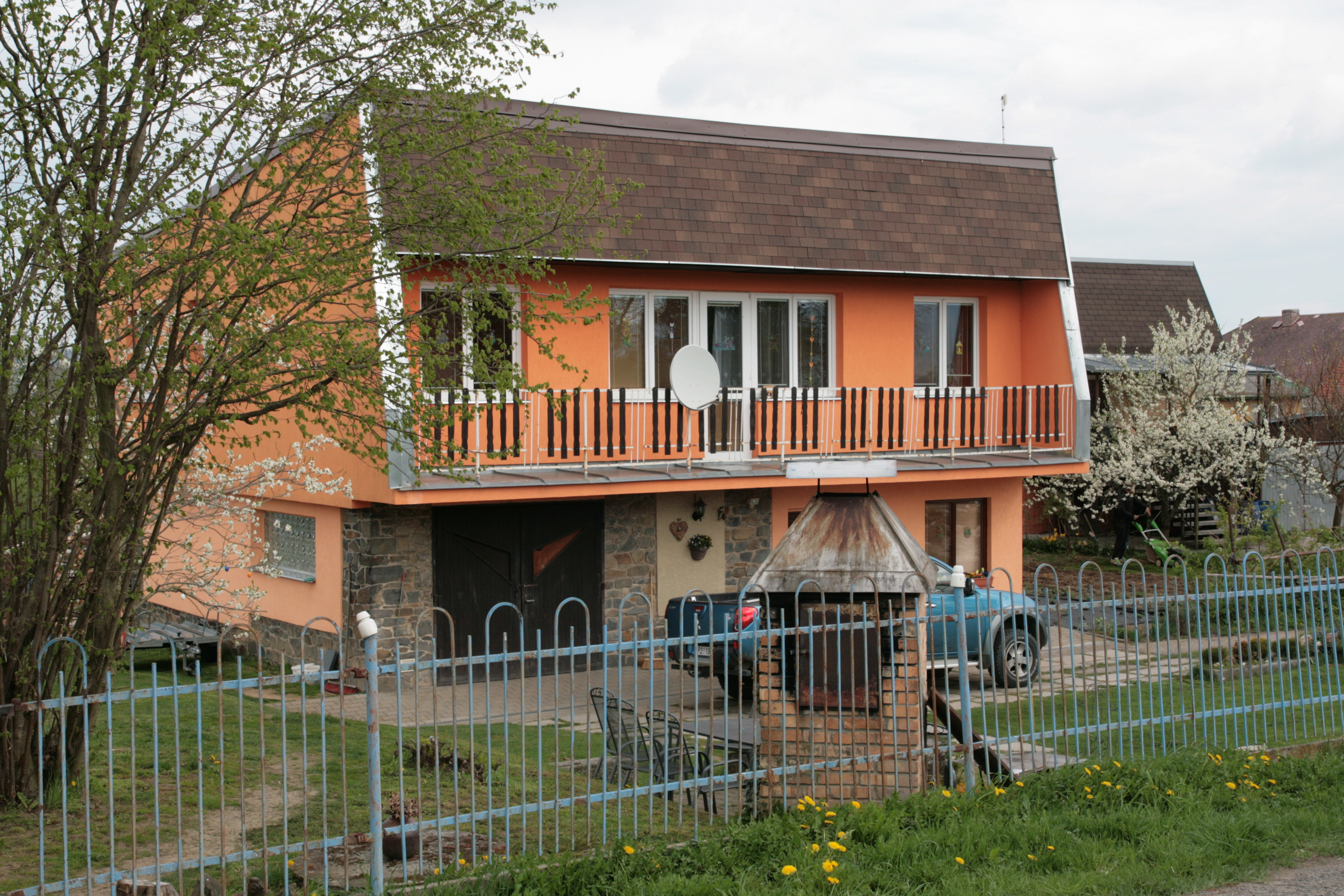
A renovated Šumperák in Klatovy

Šumperák (officially Rodinný dům typ V, which means Family house type V) is a nickname for a type of single-family detached house in the Czech Republic and Slovakia. Its design was created in the 1960s, referring success of the Czechoslovak pavilion at Expo 58 designed in so-called "Brussels style".

The house was designed by a Czech architect Josef Vaněk, firstly for the director of the hospital in a Czech town Šumperk. Later, the design has spread around the country and thousands (more than 4.5 thousands) of them were built, often modified. The design of this two floor house is famous for the balcony, which has two oblique walls on the sides.

== Description ==
Šumperák is a one-storey family house with a flat roof, where the living rooms are situated on the first floor, the ground floor is used for the background of the house and there is also a garage. The front side of the visually protruding first floor is glazed and with a continuous narrow, rather ornamental balcony. The balcony is terminated on both sides by typical windows, often with circular openings or mouldings. The diagonal motif also usually appears in the glazing of the garage door, which is located on the front left, with the main entrance on the right.

== Gallery ==
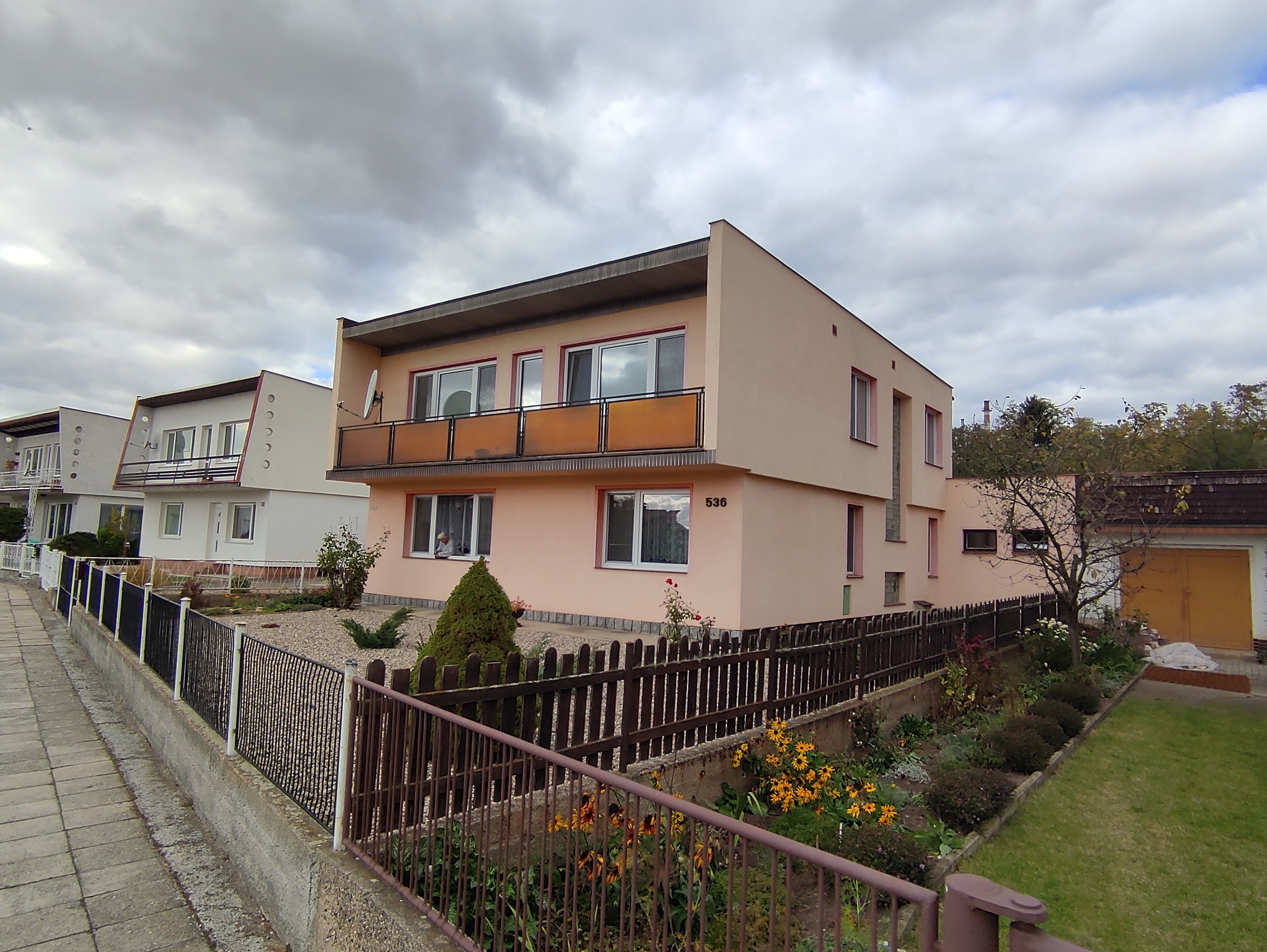
Postoloprty (2021)

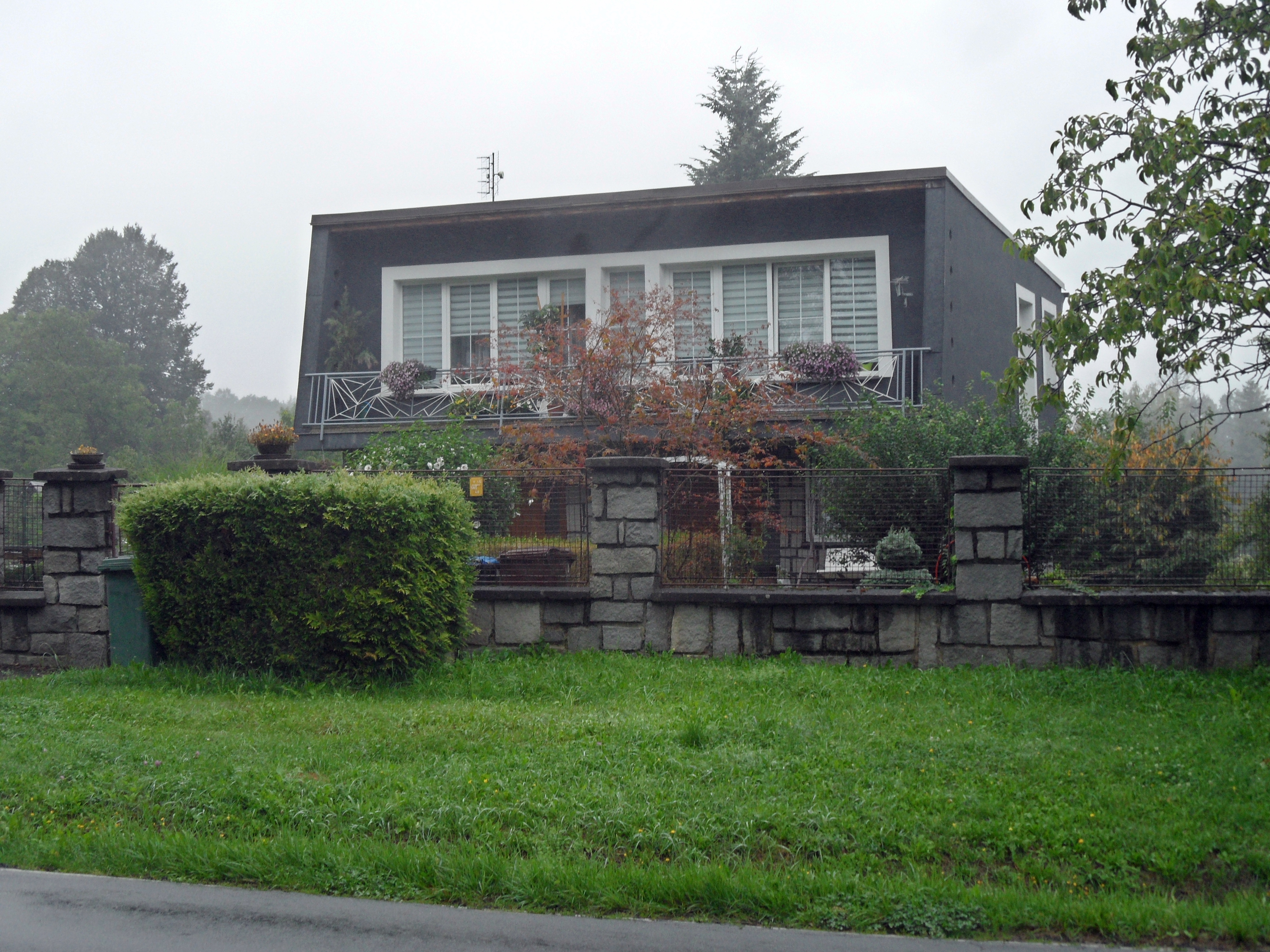
Zlaté Hory (2024)

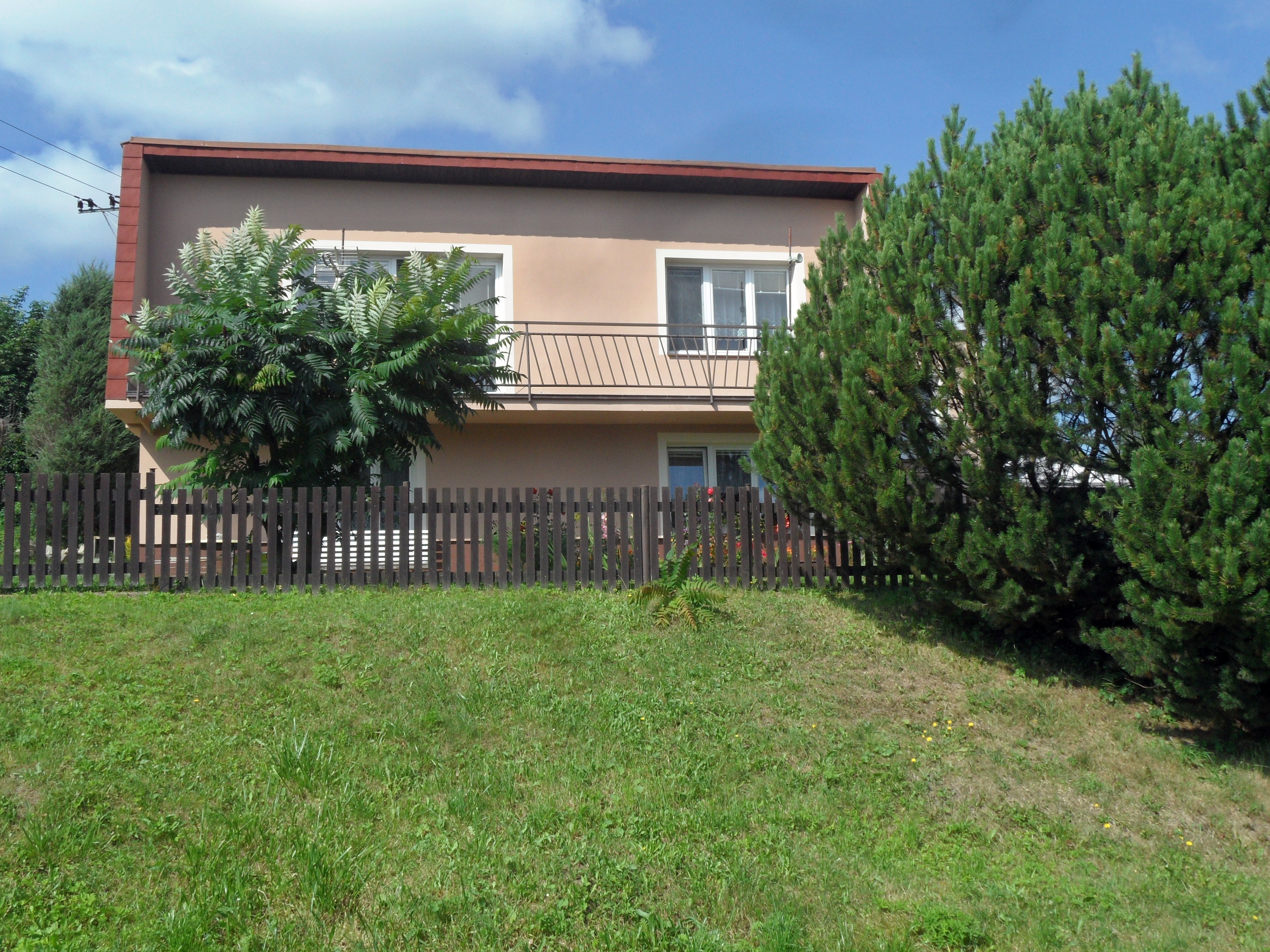
Vrbno pod Pradědem (2024)

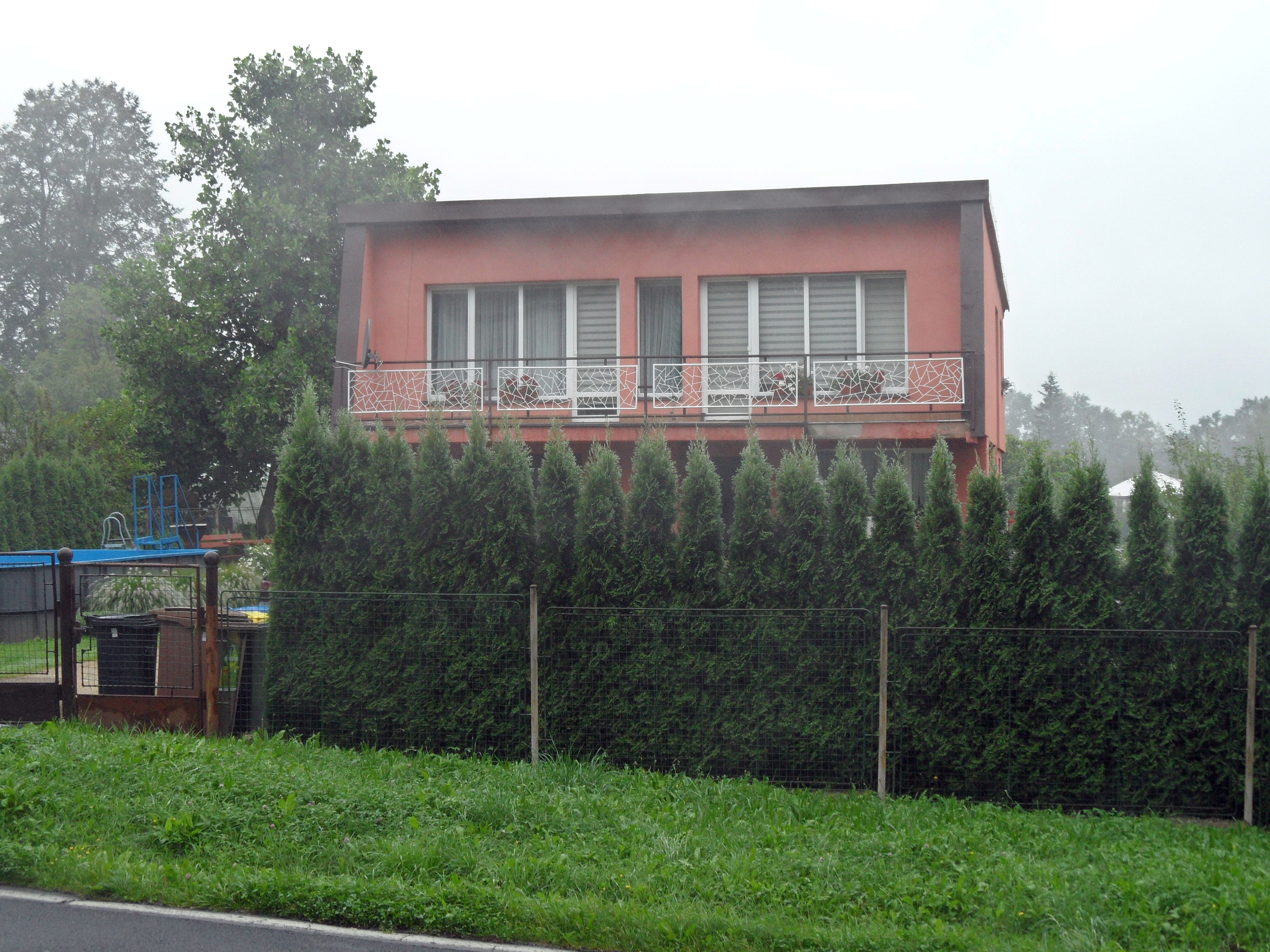
Zlaté Hory (2024)

== See also ==
- List of house types
