= Neo-eclectic architecture =

Style of architecture

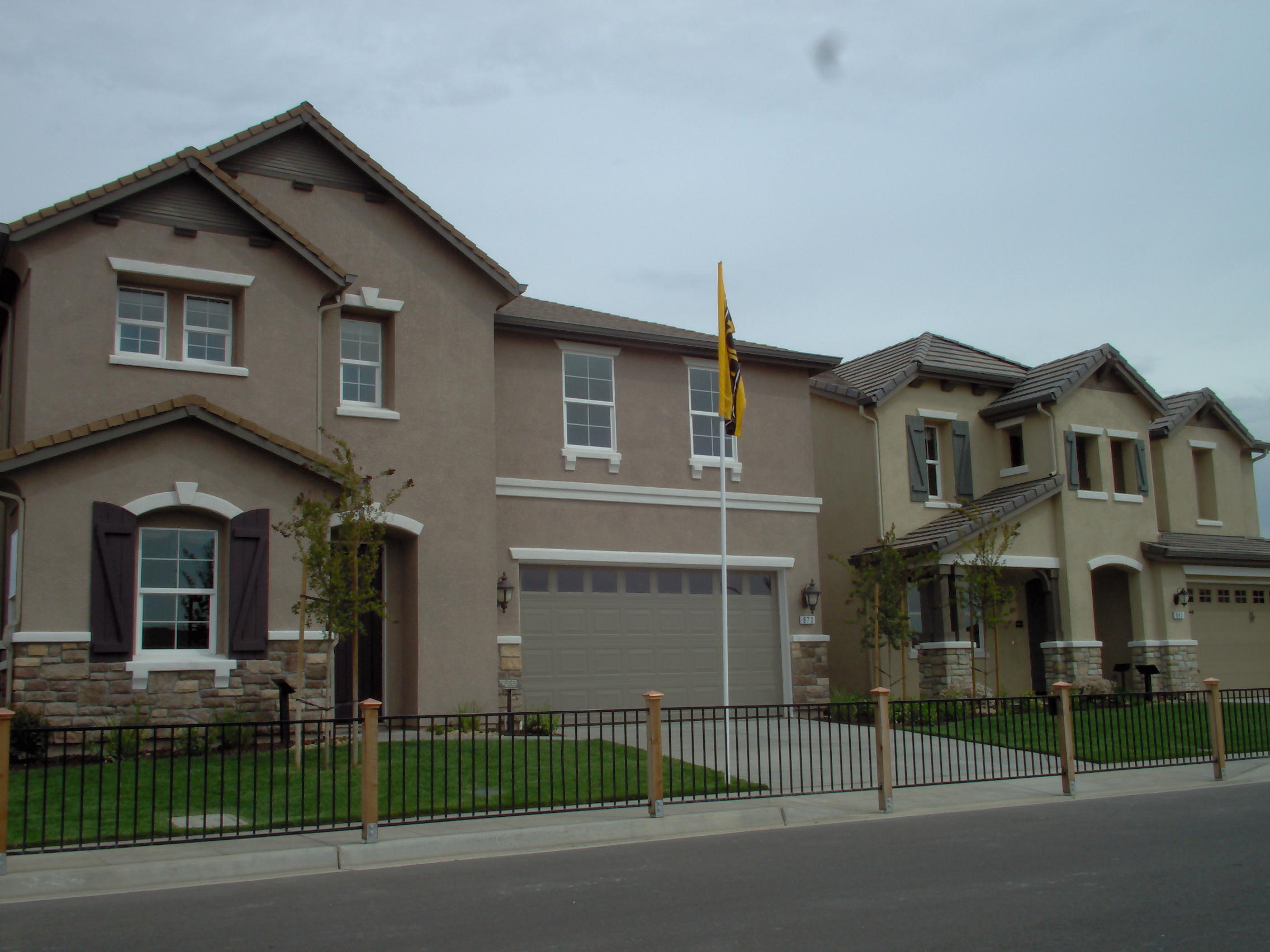
Neo-eclectic homes built in 2006 in California

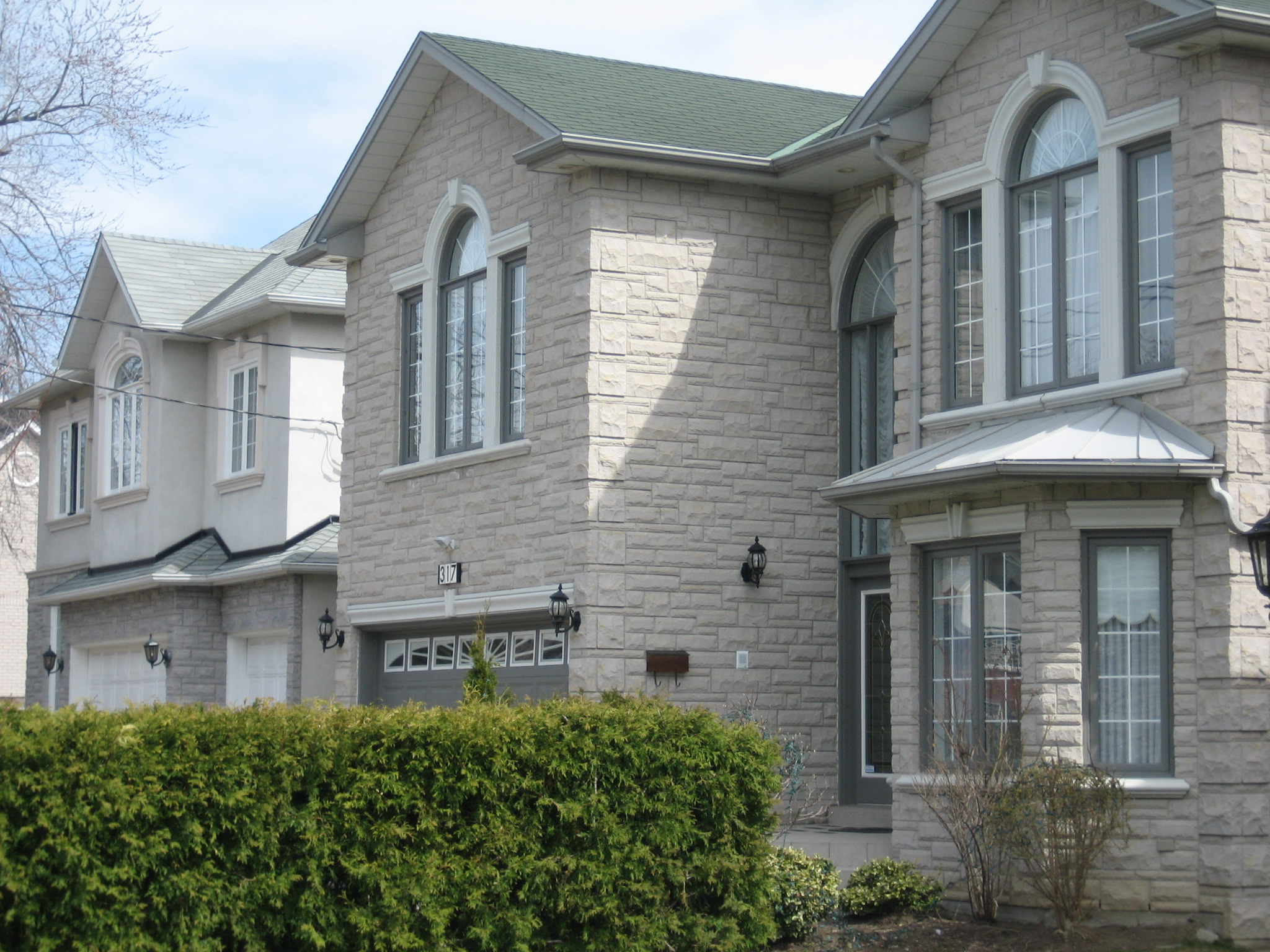
Neo-eclectic homes in the Willowdale district of Toronto, Ontario

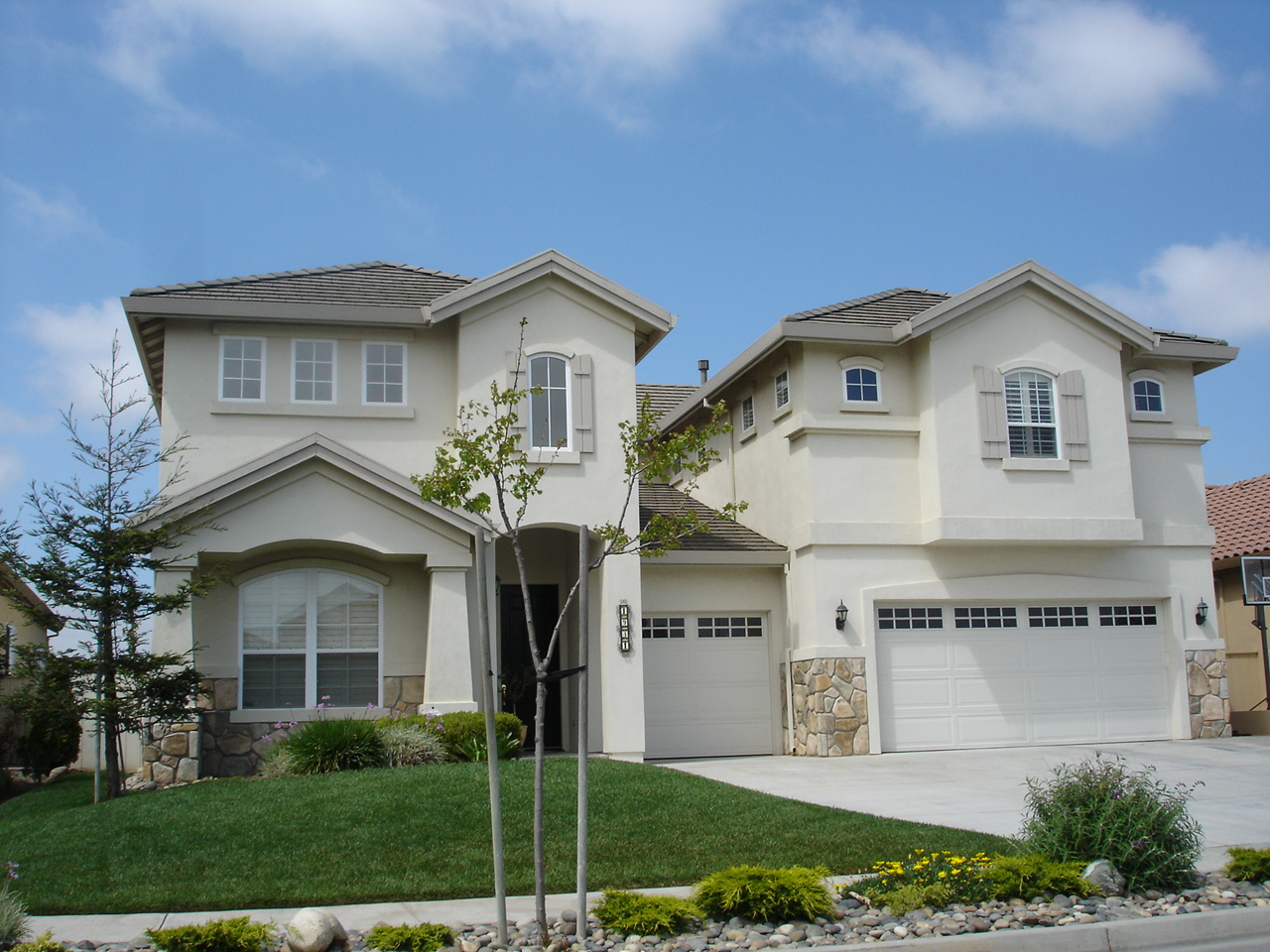
Neo-eclectic home in Salinas, California

Neo-eclectic architecture is a name for an architectural style that has influenced residential building construction in North America in the latter part of the 20th century and early part of the 21st. It is a contemporary version of Revivalism that has perennially occurred since Neoclassical architecture developed in the mid 18th century.

In contrast to the occasionally faux and low-budget Neo-Eclectic detached homesteads, the term New Classical architecture identifies contemporary buildings that stick to the basic ideals, proportions, materials and craftsmanship of traditional architecture.

== Characteristics ==
Neo-eclectic architecture combines a wide array of decorative techniques taken from an assortment of different house styles. It can be considered a devolution from the clean and unadorned modernist styles and principles behind the Mid-Century modern and Ranch-style houses that dominated North American residential design and construction in the first decades after the Second World War. It is an outgrowth of postmodern architecture, yet differs from postmodernism in that it is not creatively experimental.

== Applications ==
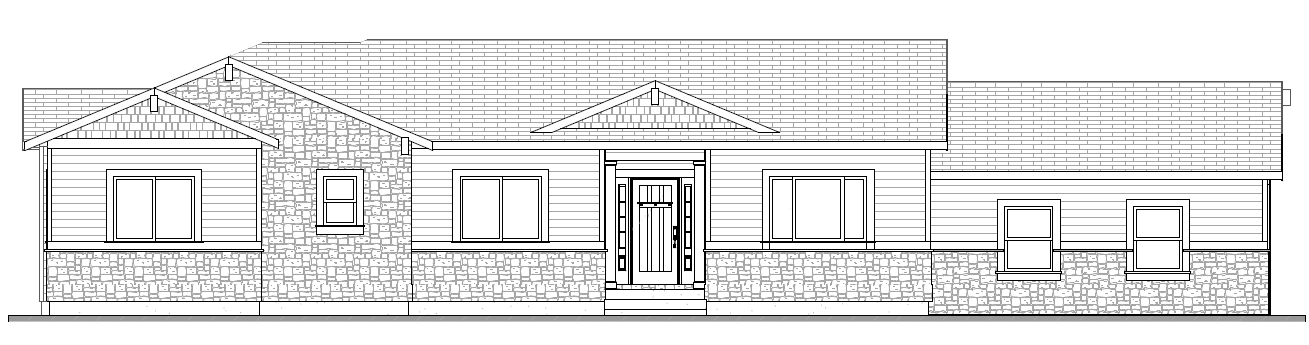
Single-Story Neo-eclectic home design in Denver, Colorado

Some Neo-Eclectic buildings will combine an array of different historical styles in a single building. A house so designed may have Cape Cod, Mission Revival, Tudor Revival, or Châteauesque and French Provincial elements all at the same time. Often houses, or whole subdivisions, will focus on one revival style. Different historical styles predominated in different regions. In California elements from the Mediterranean Revival and Spanish Colonial Revival Style continue to be a regional vernacular and popular. In New England and the Mid-Atlantic the Colonial Revival Style and Georgian Revival architecture combinations are common.

In Neo-Eclectic architecture the revival elements are almost always decorative, consisting of surface elements such as claddings and windows. Details such as heavy moldings and/or trim (that would be cut stone or plaster in traditional architecture) are usually extruded foam with a stucco veneer. Aside from specifications adjusted for lower quality, newer growth lumber, the basic construction of Neo-Eclectic houses is unchanged from previous house styles such as the ranch-style house. An important development leading to the modern Neo-Eclectic style is the popularity of EIFS, a form of external insulation that is easy to apply and can be coloured and shaped to appear like an array of different materials such as stucco and stone.

== Critiques ==
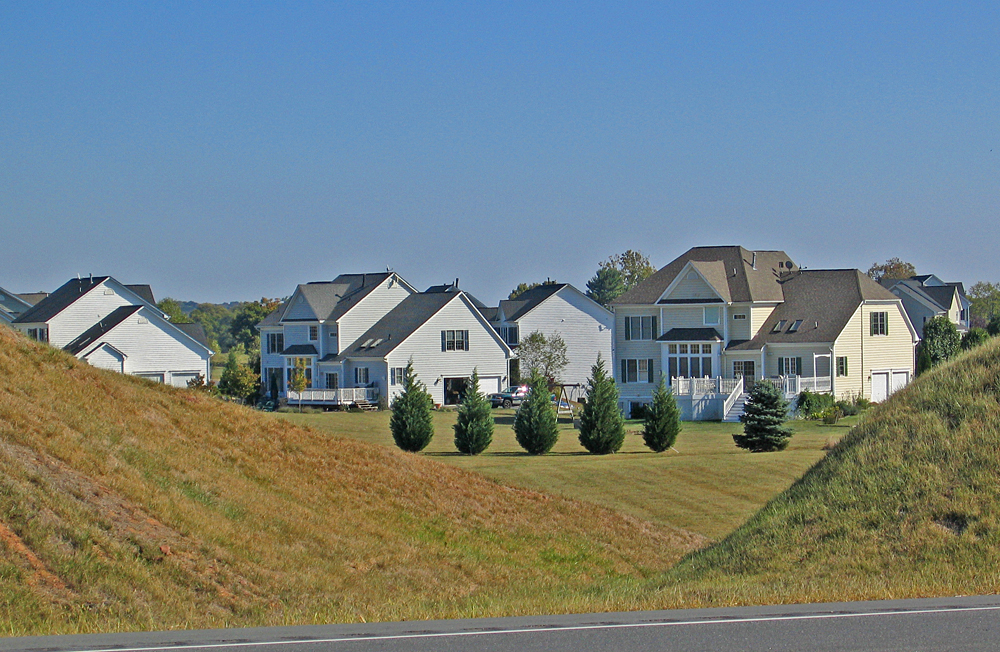
A group of McMansions in a housing development in Leesburg, Virginia. Some McMansions are described as utilising neo-eclectic architecture.

Neo-eclectic architecture is most prominent in what are pejoratively known as McMansions, but it has been embraced by almost all residential builders. Across North America most suburbs built in the last three decades can largely be described as Neo-Eclectic.

Critics of Neo-Eclectic architecture see the style as pretentious, wasteful and/or garish, and unoriginal. Typically and somewhat deceptively, the Neo-Eclectic style plays an instrumental role in making cheaply built, over-sized tract homes on comparatively small parcels of land appear as something far greater than the sum of their parts.

== See also ==
- New Classical Architecture, a more accurate reference style to historical architecture.
- Neomodern architecture, a current modernist response.
- Sustainable architecture
- Sustainable development
- Sustainable design
- Snout house
- Mar del Plata style, an Argentine 20th century eclectic style
