= Linked house =

Housing with a common basement wall

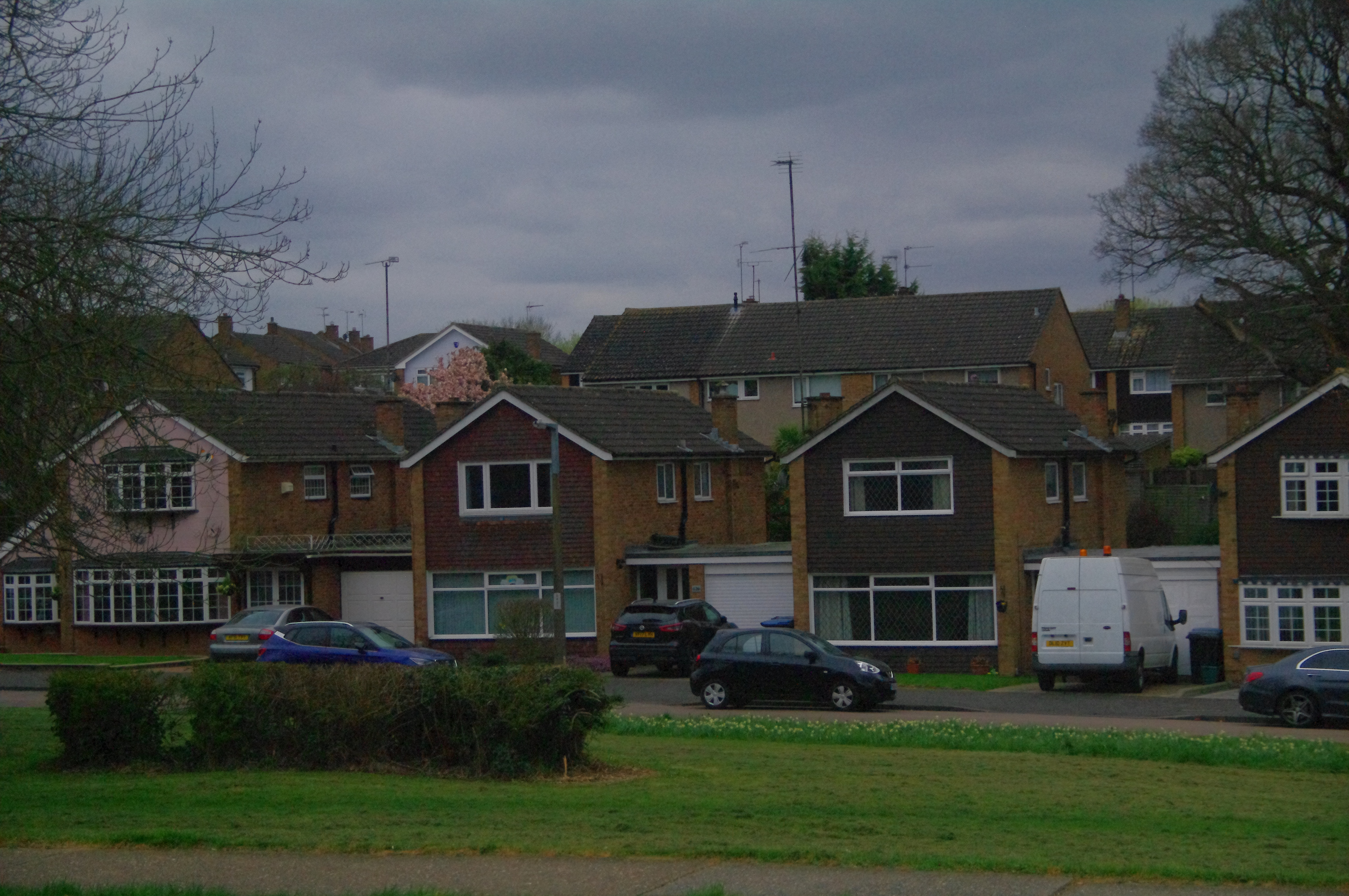
Harlow, Great Britain. The garages abut both the house to which each garage belongs and its neighbour to the right.

A linked house is a type of house whereby the homes above ground appear to be detached, but they share a common wall in the basement or foundation. In terms of value, a linked house would be generally more expensive than a semi-detached house but less expensive than a truly detached house.

The linked house style was popular in the 1970s and 1980s in the Greater Toronto Area, where builders could "construct what looked like detached houses on lots which were designated for semi-detached models". A linked house, however, is not a semi-detached house since no above-ground walls are shared. A subset of semi-detached house where a pair of homes share basement and garage walls are called linked semi-detached but these are not considered linked houses.

Compared to neighboring pair of true detached houses, a pair of linked homes will be extremely close together with a narrow unusable alley. However, this difference may not be necessarily noticeable unless measured or checking municipal zoning, and real-estate agents have often unscrupulously advertised a linked house as a detached house on the resale market. Today, builders will opt to build true detached homes because they can sell for much more than linked houses, enough to offset the savings of a common foundation in linked houses.

== See also ==
- List of house types
