= Slope house =

House placed in slope

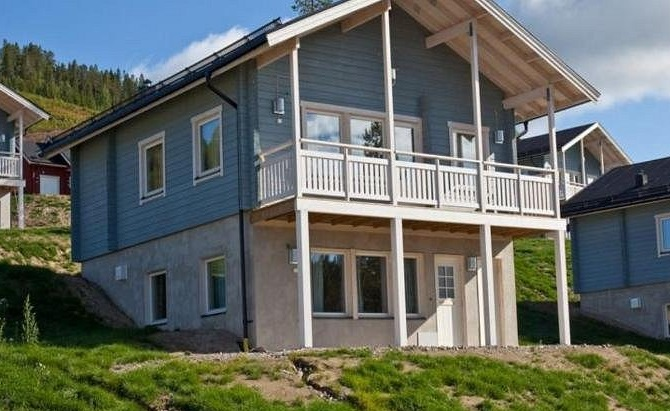
Slope house. The different floors have different ground levels; the lower floor is partly underground.

A slope house or souterrain house is a house with soil or rock completely covering one wall and part of two more on the bottom floor. The house may have two entries, depending on the ground level.

The main reason for building a slope house is due to the landscape—for example, if the land where the house should be built is placed on a hill or a slope on a mountain. Unlike an earth-sheltered building, the primary reason is not to use the thermal mass from the surrounding earth to insulate the house. Sometimes the soil is excavated to make the floor area the same on both upper and lower floor. The soil can also be partly excavated, making the area for the lower floor smaller. When a house is built in a slope the advantage in an open country is the view, mountain, lake or meadow.

== See also ==
- Earth shelter
