= Single-family detached home =

Standalone house

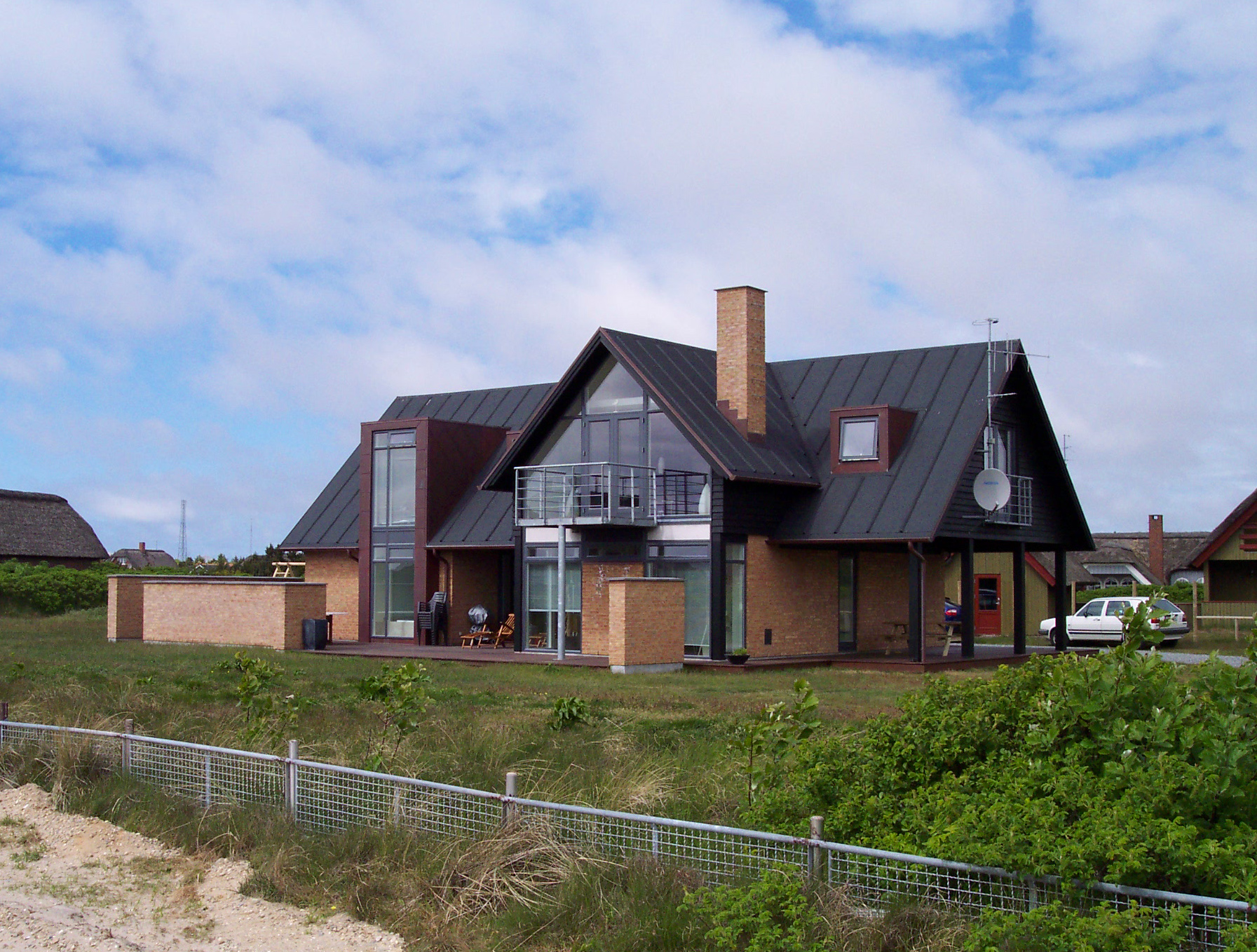
A Northern European single-family detached home

A single-family detached home – also called a single-detached dwelling, single-family residence (SFR), independent house, separate house, or other similar terms – is a free-standing residential building. It is defined in opposition to a multi-family residential dwelling.

== Definitions ==
A single detached dwelling contains only one dwelling unit and is completely separated by open space on all sides from any other structure, except its own garage or shed.

— Statistics Canada

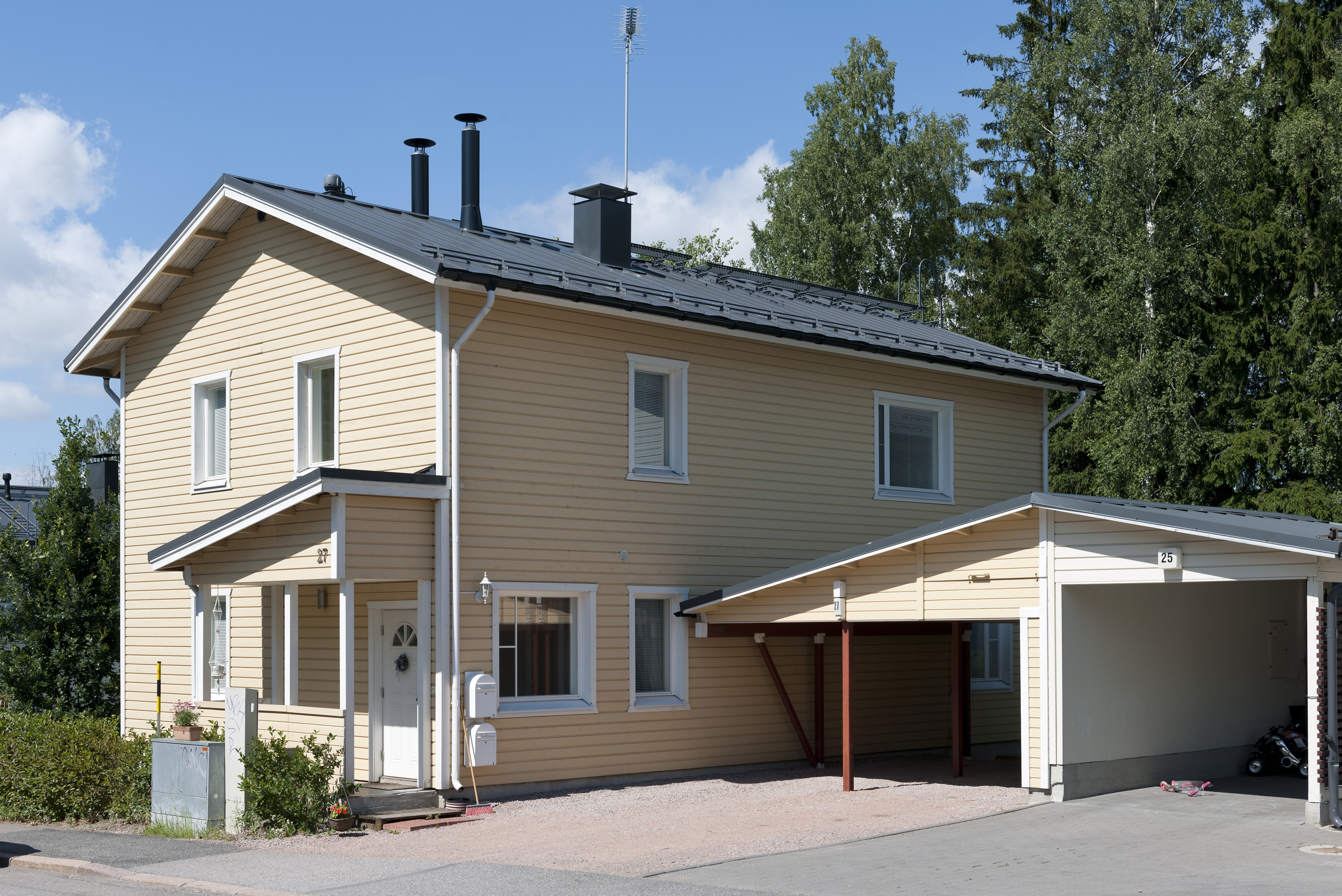
A detached home with a garage in Maunula, Helsinki, Finland

The definition of this type of house may vary between legal jurisdictions or statistical agencies. The definition, however, generally includes two elements:

- Single-family (home, house, or dwelling) means that the building is usually occupied by just one household or family and consists of just one dwelling unit or suite. In some jurisdictions, allowances are made for basement suites or accessory dwelling units without changing the description from "single-family". It does exclude, however, any short-term accommodation (hotel, motels, inns), large-scale rental accommodation (rooming or boarding houses, apartments), or condominia.
- Detached (house, home, or dwelling) means that the building does not share walls with other houses. This excludes duplexes, triplexes, fourplexes, or linked houses, as well as all terraced houses and most especially tower blocks which can hold hundreds of families in a single building.

Most single-family homes are built on lots larger than the structure itself, adding an area surrounding the house, which is commonly called a yard in North American English or a garden in British English. Garages can also be found on many lots. Houses with an attached front entry garage closer to the street than any other part of the house are often derisively called a snout house.

=== Regional terminologies ===
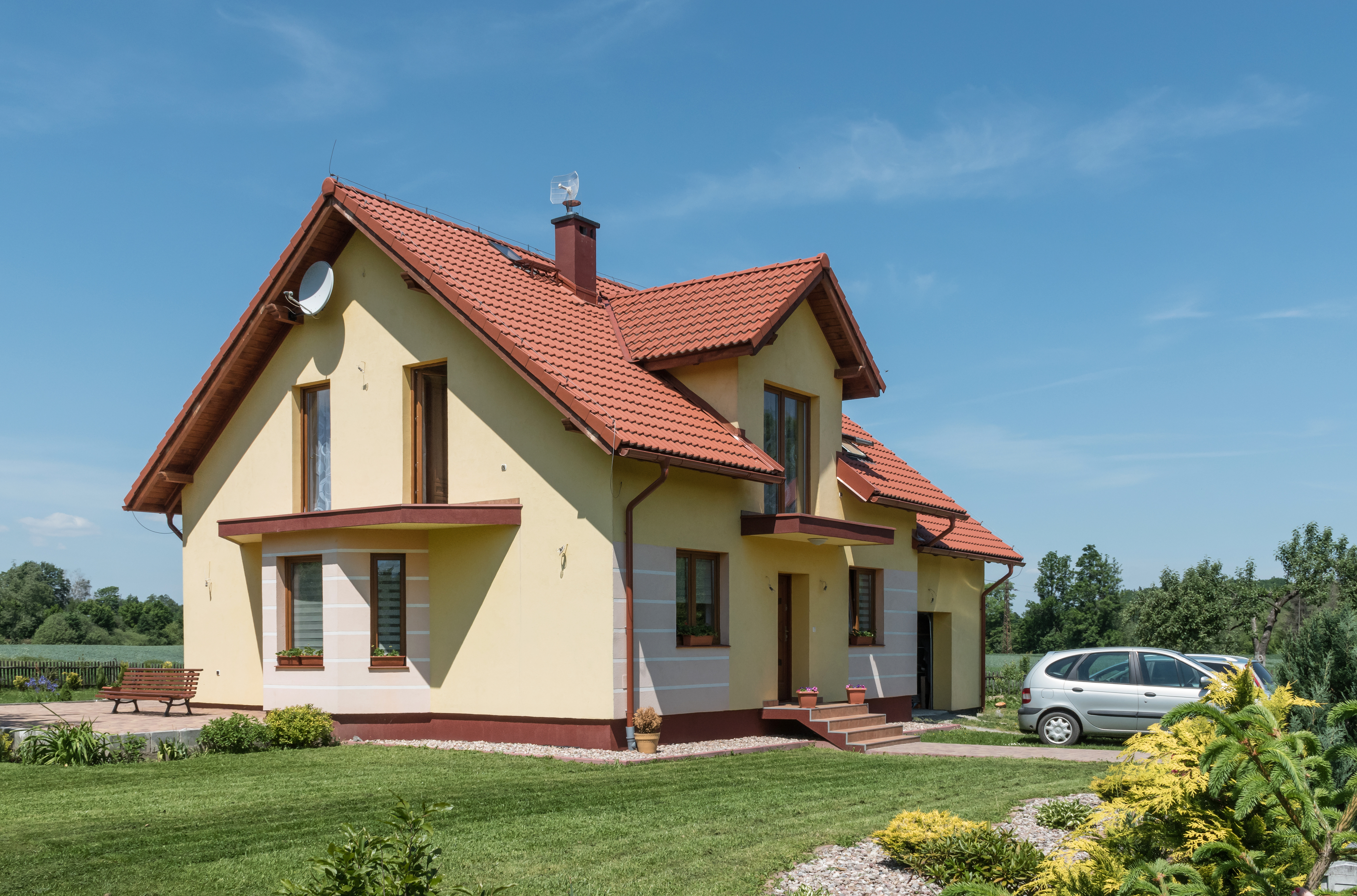
Typical suburban single-family house in Poland

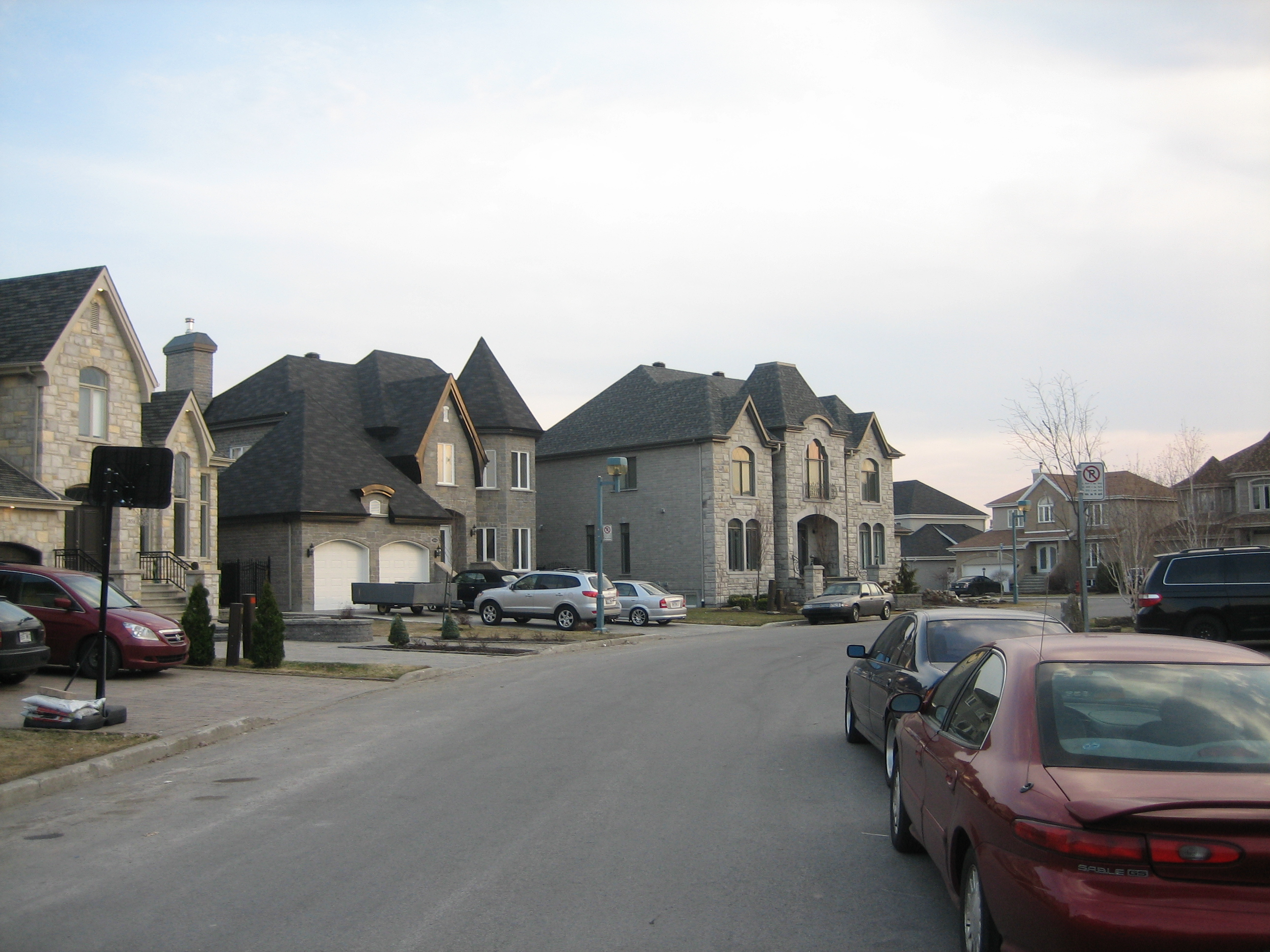
Single-family houses in Montreal

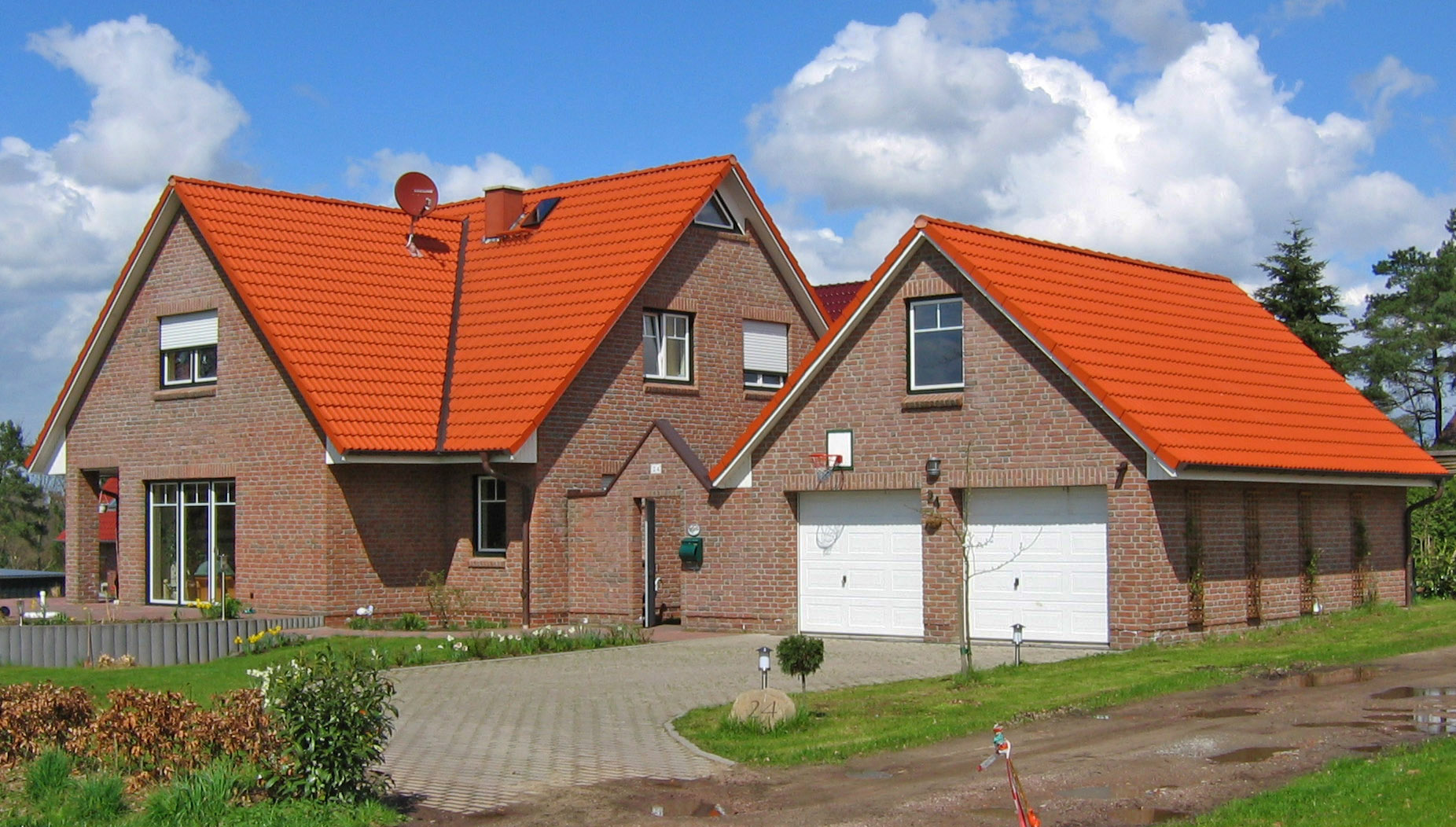
Typical single-family home in Northern Germany

Terms corresponding to a single-family detached home in common use are single-family home (in the US and Canada), single-detached dwelling (in Canada), detached house (in the United Kingdom and Canada), and separate house (in New Zealand).

In the United Kingdom, the term single-family home is almost unknown, except through Internet exposure to US media. Whereas in the US, housing is commonly divided into "single-family homes", "multi-family dwellings", "condo/townhouse", etc., the primary division of residential property in British terminology is between "houses" (including "detached", "semi-detached", and "terraced" houses and bungalows) and "flats" (i.e., "apartments" or "condominiums" in American English).

== History and distribution ==
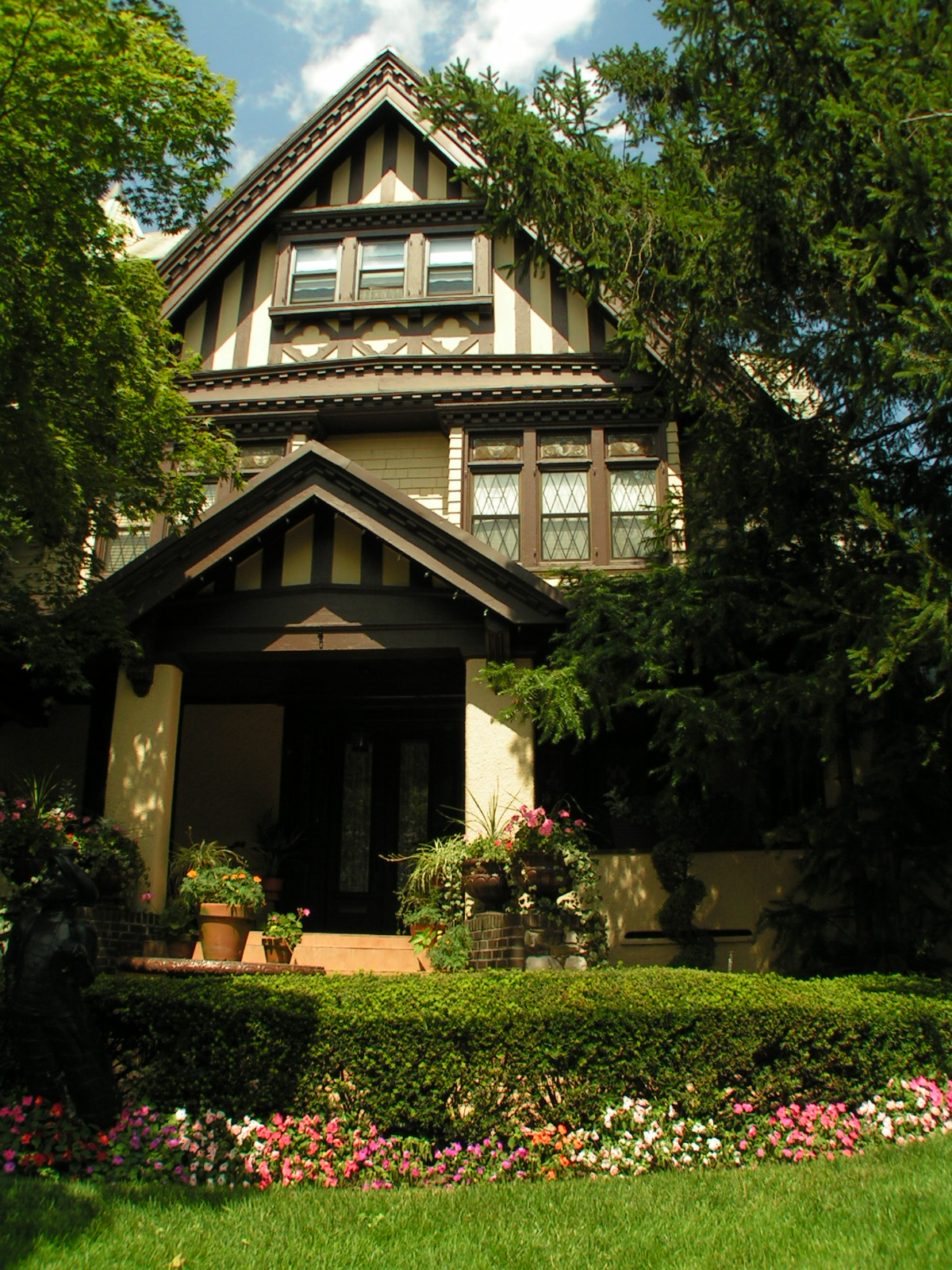
The Saitta House, Dyker Heights, Brooklyn, New York, built in 1899, is a single-family detached home

In pre-industrial societies, most people lived in multi-family dwellings for most of their lives. A child lived with their parents from birth until marriage and then generally moved in with the parents of the man (patrilocal) or the woman (matrilocal) so that the grandparents could help raise the young children and so the middle generation could care for their aging parents. This type of arrangement also saved some of the effort and materials used for construction and, in colder climates, heating. If people had to move to a new place or were wealthy enough, they could build or buy a home for their own family, but this was not the norm.

The idea of a nuclear family living separately from their relatives as the norm is a relatively recent development related to rising living standards in North America and Europe during the early modern and modern eras. In the New World, where land was plentiful, settlement patterns were quite different from the close-knit villages of Europe, meaning many more people lived in large farms separated from their neighbors. This has produced a cultural preference in settler societies for privacy and space. A countervailing trend has been industrialization and urbanization, which has seen more people worldwide move into multi-story apartment blocks. In the New World, this type of densification was halted and reversed following the Second World War when increased automobile ownership and cheaper building and heating costs produced suburbanization instead.

Single-family homes are now common in rural and suburban and even some urban areas across the New World and Europe, as well as wealthier enclaves within the Third World. They are most common in low-density, high-income regions. For example, in Canada, according to the 2006 census, 55.3% of the population lived in single-detached houses, but this varied substantially by region. In the city of Montreal, Quebec, Canada's second-most populous municipality, only 7.5% of the population lived in single-detached homes; in contrast, in the city of Calgary, the third-most populous, 57.8% did. Note that this includes the "city limits" populations only, not the wider region. Culturally, single-family houses are associated with suburbanization in many parts of the world. Owning a home with a yard and a "white picket fence" is seen as a key component of the "American dream" (which also exists with variations in other parts of the world).

In the 21st century, a lack of affordable housing, the climate change impacts of urban sprawl and car dependency, and concerns about racial inequality have increasingly led cities to abandon single-family housing and single-family zoning in favor of higher-density zones.

== Separating types of homes ==
House types include:

- Cottage, a small house. In the US, a cottage typically has four main rooms, two on either side of a central corridor. It is common to find a lean-to added to the back of the cottage, which may accommodate the kitchen, laundry, and bathroom. In Australia, it is common for a cottage to have a verandah across its front. In the UK and Ireland, any small, old (especially pre-World War I) house in a rural or formerly rural location, whether with one, two, or (rarely) three stories, is a cottage.
- Bungalow, in American English, this term describes a medium- to large-sized freestanding house on a generous block in the suburbs, with a generally less formal floor plan than a villa. Some rooms in a bungalow typically have doors that link them together. Bungalows may feature a flat roof. In British English, it refers to any single-storey house (much rarer in the UK than in the US).
- Villa, a term originating from Roman times when it was used to refer to a large house which one might retreat to in the country. In the late 19th and early 20th centuries, villa suggested a freestanding comfortable-sized house on a large block, generally found in the suburbs. In Victorian terraced housing, a villa was a house larger than the average byelaw terraced house, often having double street frontage.
- Mansion, a very large, luxurious house, typically associated with exceptional wealth or aristocracy, usually of more than one story, on a large block of land or estate.
  Mansions usually will have many more rooms and bedrooms than a typical single-family home, including specialty rooms, such as a library, study, conservatory, theater, greenhouse, infinity pool, bowling alley, or server room.
  Many mansions are too large to be maintained solely by the owner, and there will be maintenance staff. This staff may also live on-site in 'servant quarters'.
- Palace, a particularly grand mansion, usually the home of a high ranking government official like a country's ruler.
- Castle, a medieval European or feudal Japanese fortified dwelling formerly occupied by a lord and his family. The term castle can also refer to a house or mansion with some of the architectural characteristics of medieval castles.

== See also ==
- Semi-detached
- Single-family zoning
