= Snout house =

House with a protruding garage in front

A snout house is a house with a protruding garage that takes up most of the street frontage. This layout is worked into many styles of houses, including single-family houses, duplexes and other multifamily structures.

== Architectural features ==
Such design is typically employed in the United States and Canada to make a dwelling affordable for a family of modest income by combining a narrow lot (sometimes as small as 35 feet (10.6 metres) in width) with a minimum 5 feet setback from each side line, which results in a 25 foot (7.5 metre) wide house. When a two car garage is added, typically of up to 20 feet (6 metres) or better in width, with no back of lot access, the garage dominates the frontage.

This design can be contrasted with older developments in which a single detached garage is placed at the back corner of the lot, typically added on after the original construction, and which is built with zero lot line clearance and is accessible since the house is not centered on the lot, but rather offset to one side. Such layouts do not meet setback standards contained in many zoning codes, however.

One means to address this is to place an attached single car garage, set back from the house frontage, on one side, perhaps with zero lot line clearance which requires more fire resistant construction and special development permitting. Where investment is made in a Planned Unit Development ("PUD"), the storage of vehicles for several residences can be grouped and placed out of the way, although this tends to not be favored by buyers owing to the inconvenience and reduced security of the arrangement.

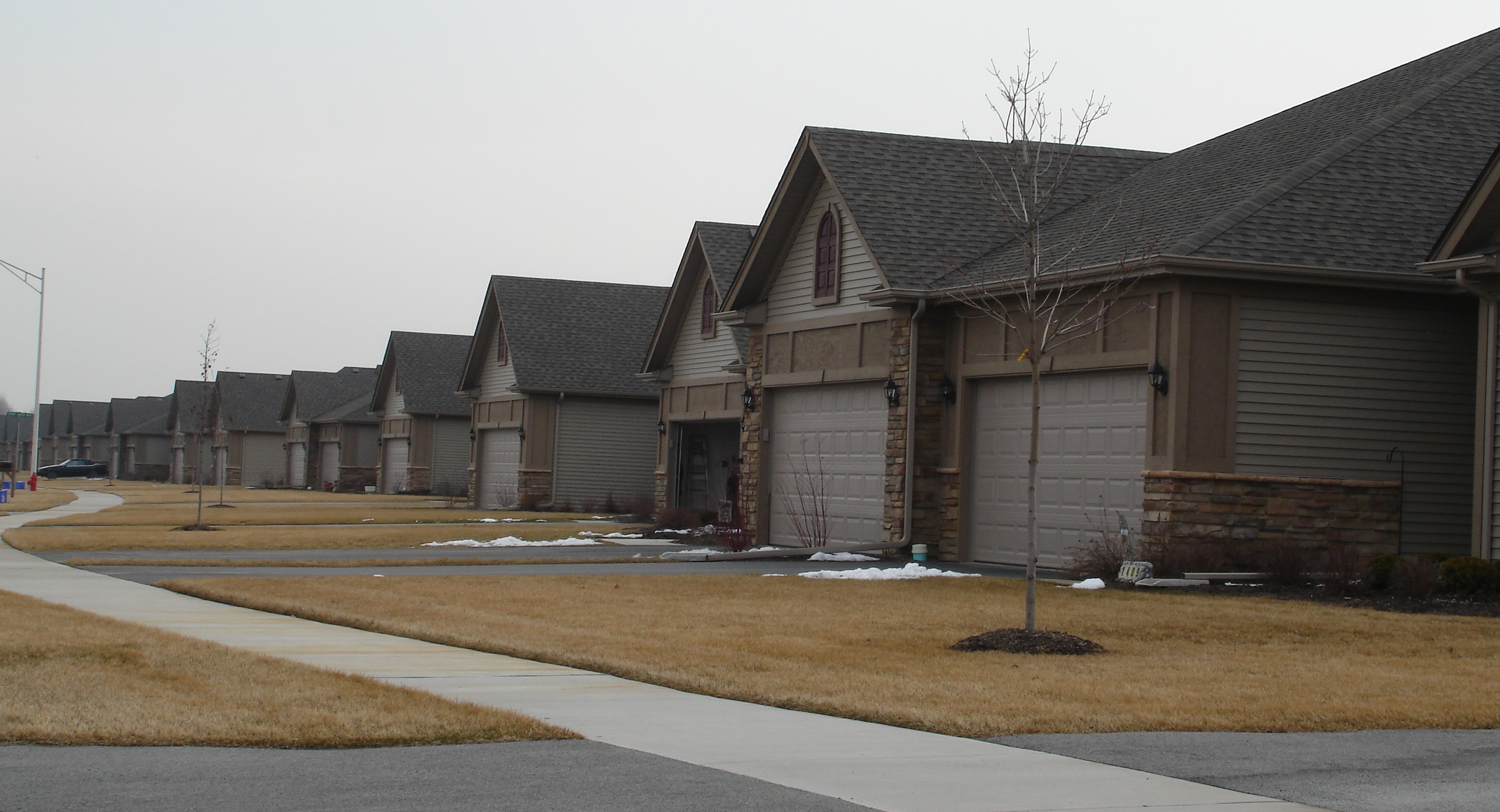
Front of snout houses in
Schererville, Indiana

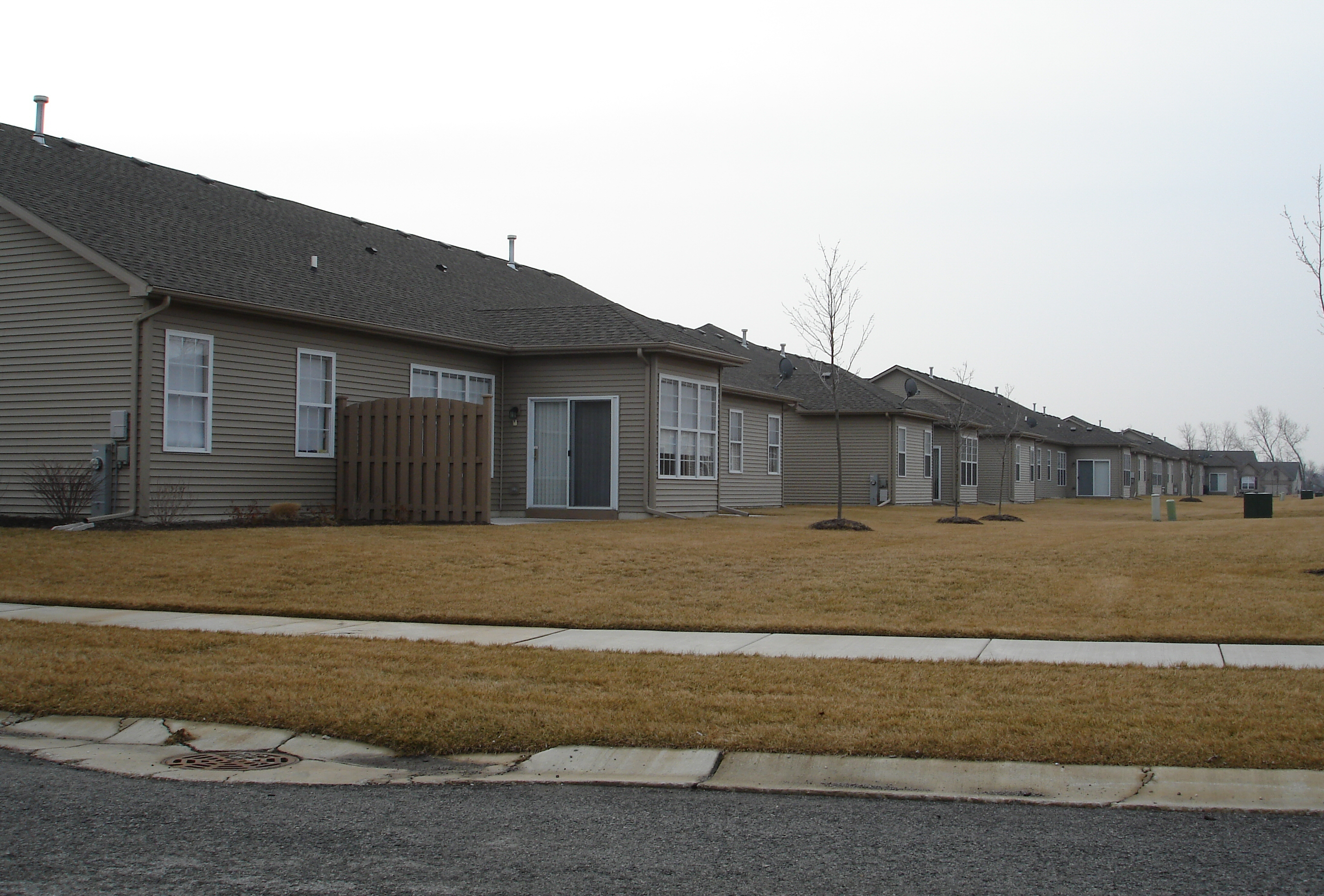
Rear view of a tract of snout houses

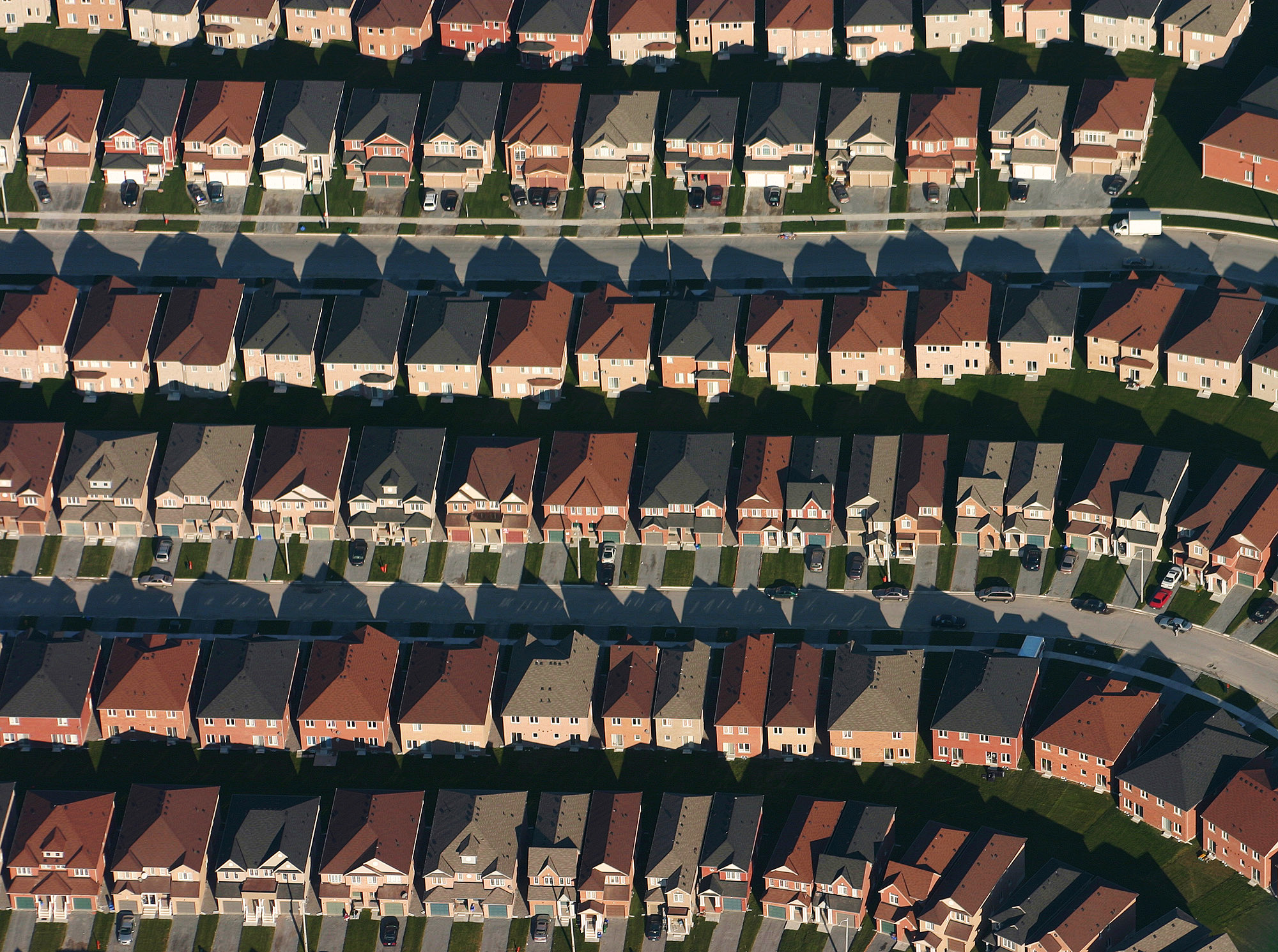
Two-story snout houses in Markham, Ontario

== See also ==
- Neo-eclectic architecture
- Tract housing
- Car dependency
