= Dedham Mall =

Former indoor shopping mall turned power center in Massachusetts

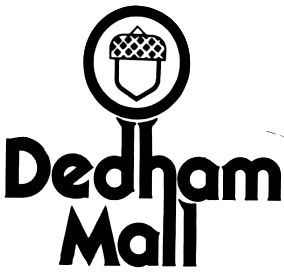
- Location: Dedham, Massachusetts, United States
- Coordinates: 42.244770°N 71.177956°W
- Address: 300 Providence Hwy, Dedham, MA 02026
- Opened: September 1967
- Renovated: 2004-2005
- Closed: 2005 (enclosed mall operations)
- Developer: Charles River Arcade Corporation
- Owner: Kimco Realty
- Architect: J.L. Hayden, Donald Gillespie, Richard Wood
- Num. of stores: 60 (enclosed operations)
- Floor area: 420,000 square feet (39,000 m2) enclosed mall, 510,000 square feet (47,000 m2) power center
- Floors: 1
- Website: DedhamPoint

The Dedham Mall is a former indoor shopping mall which currently operates as an open-air power center located on Route 1A in Dedham, Massachusetts. The mall served the adjacent southeastern neighborhoods of Boston including West Roxbury, Roslindale, Readville and Hyde Park as well as the surrounding suburban towns of Westwood, Milton, and Needham. The site is located north of downtown Dedham and abuts the Charles River to the west.

At its peak, the mall featured national anchor stores such as Sears, Bradlees, and Woolworth’s, along with dozens of smaller retailers. Beginning in the early 2000s, the property underwent a significant transformation from an enclosed mall into an outward-facing power center. Despite the changes in layout and tenant mix, the site continues to operate under the "Dedham Mall" name; however, it is functionally no longer an indoor mall.

== History ==
The Dedham Mall was conceived in the early 1960s as a value capture opportunity led by Michael Pacella and Pasquale Franchi of the Charles River Arcade Corporation on land that had previously been occupied by a town dump and the former right-of-way of the West Roxbury Branch railroad line. The location was ideal due to its proximity to major transportation routes, including the Dedham Turnpike (now Washington Street) and Providence Highway (U.S. Route 1A). Additionally, the site's flat terrain and availability of large parcels made it suitable for accommodating the expansive footprint required for a large regional shopping center to serve the southeastern Boston area.

The development of the mall was engineered by J.L. Hayden with architecture by Donald Gillespie, and Richard Wood served as project director. Groundbreaking for the mall (then called the “Charles River Arcade”) took place on July 1, 1964. Construction involved significant alterations to the landscape, including piping part of Mother Brook underground and reclaiming marshlands near the head of the brook to make the land suitable for development. Initial plans hoped for a 1965 opening, but the mall officially opened in 1967 under the name Dedham Mall. Upon opening, Dedham Mall spanned roughly 420,000 square feet (39,000 m^{2}) and featured a variety of retailers and amenities of the time. Original anchor stores included a Sears department store, a Bradlees discount department store, and an F. W. Woolworth five-and-dime (which also housed a luncheonette diner). A Stop & Shop supermarket was also among the early major tenants.

As originally built, Dedham Mall was a fully enclosed, single-story shopping mall with an L-shaped floorplan. Its main concourse was lined with dozens of stores and anchored at each end by large retailers (Sears at one end and Bradlees/Stop & Shop at the other). The Woolworth’s variety store was located near the center of the mall. A unique design feature of the 1960s mall was a small sunken garden seating area in the middle of the corridor, where shoppers could sit by planters; this space was used for seasonal kiosks (such as a temporary Hickory Farms shop during the holidays). The interior decor was typical for the era, with terrazzo floors. Skylights and a central atrium area brought some natural light into the otherwise windowless interior. In the 1970s, a second level was partially added above some storefronts for offices, but the retail space remained predominantly one-story. In 1973, Thomas J. Flatley of the Flately Company would purchase the mall. By the mid-1980s, the mall housed more than 60 stores.

=== Decline ===
By the early 1990s, the Dedham Mall would see a rapid decline from which it would not recover. The downturn can be partially attributed to the aging structure of the mall itself, which had not undergone any significant expansions or modern renovations up to that point. At the same time, new strip centers and big-box retailers along the Route 1 corridor began to draw away the same customer base. Nearby regional malls such as South Shore Plaza in Braintree and The Shops at Chestnut Hill in Newton underwent substantial renovations and expansions, modernizing their interiors and attracting higher-end anchor tenants; these centers were better positioned to retain and grow their shopper base, while Dedham Mall remained physically outdated and increasingly outcompeted with little to no investment.

A series of anchor store departures and bankruptcies further accelerated the mall’s decline. The mall’s Woolworth’s store closed in 1997 when the chain went out of business nationwide, leaving a major vacancy. The original Stop & Shop supermarket had also closed by the early 1990s, and its former space was subdivided among smaller stores such as a Walgreens drugstore, T.J. Maxx, Tello’s clothing, and Record Town music store. By the late 1990s, Flatley attempted to revitalize the property by bringing in new retailers. In 1999–2000, Flatley added popular apparel chains Old Navy and The Gap as junior anchors and undertook modest interior renovations. The renovation of the mall’s common areas received cosmetic updates such as new lighting, updated flooring, and the removal of some 1970s design elements. Previous plans to implement a full food court or entertainment wing was never added, and the mall maintained its original footprint until the post-2003 redevelopment.

Despite these efforts, the mall struggled to compete with larger regional shopping centers and the emerging trend of big-box power centers. Several longstanding tenants from the 1970s and 80s – such as local boutiques and the mall’s original family-run shops – had already shut their doors. Bradlees, one of Dedham Mall’s original anchor department stores, went out of business in early 2001 along with the entire Bradlees chain. The mall’s Walgreens pharmacy and the Friendly’s ice cream parlor (both located in the former grocery wing) closed in 2000. The Old Navy and Gap stores added in 1999 proved insufficient to reverse declining foot traffic.

Between 2000 and 2003, Dedham Mall experienced an exodus of its remaining interior tenants. National chains like Record Town, Kay-Bee Toys, and Fashion Bug closed their mall locations during this period, in some cases due to their own corporate bankruptcies. Waldenbooks, which had succeeded the old Paperback Booksmith, shut down by early 2003. By mid-2003, nearly all inline stores were gone; only a handful of tenants were still operating inside the mostly vacant concourse. These last holdouts included a RadioShack, a FootAction shoe store, and the Sears anchor store. Mall management sealed off sections of the interior corridor and erected temporary walls to block access to closed-off wings. Shoppers increasingly patronized the newer exterior-facing stores (Old Navy and a DSW Shoe Warehouse) that had entrances directly from the parking lot, bypassing the empty halls of the. Sears – which had been an original 1967 anchor – remarkably remained open, even as it became the only large store still using the interior mall entrance. By late 2003, all retail activity effectively shifted to exterior storefronts.

=== Redevelopment ===
Facing the loss of most tenants, the owners of Dedham Mall decided to fundamentally overhaul the complex in the mid-2000s. Plans were developed to "de-mall" the property – converting it from an enclosed mall into an outward-facing shopping center. The envisioned redevelopment ultimately moved forward in stages beginning in 2004. The majority of the original enclosed structure (except for the Sears building) was demolished to make way for new big-box stores and a reconfigured parking layout. The former Bradlees anchor building (approximately 76,000 square feet (7,100 m^{2}) and large portions of the mall’s interior corridor were torn down in 2004–2005. In their place, developers constructed a Lowe’s home improvement store as a new anchor, which opened in 2005 on the south end of the property. The remaining inline store spaces were rebuilt or reoriented with exterior entrances, effectively turning the site into a power center. Notably, the Dedham Mall name would be retained during this transition despite the property no longer functioning as an enclosed mall.

During this mid-2000s transformation, several new or returning anchor tenants were secured to fill out the renovated Dedham Mall. Stop & Shop, the grocery chain that had been part of the mall’s early years, returned to the property by opening a new, larger supermarket on site, restoring a grocery anchor to the center. T.J. Maxx, which had already been in the mall since the 1990s, continued operations and transitioned to an exterior-facing format. Other big-box retailers joined as well including DSW Shoe Warehouse operated in a standalone format, and a Dick’s Sporting Goods store was added to the lineup. By the late 2000s, Dedham Mall had completed its conversion into an open-air retail destination. The Flatley Company, which had owned the mall through its construction, decline, and redevelopment, sold the property in 2007 to The Wilder Companies for approximately $156 million and subsequently took over management and leasing.

The transition of the enclosed mall would prove successful. Over time, additional changes occurred to the tenant mix. Circuit City, which had replaced Child World in an outparcel, closed when that chain liquidated in 2009; its building was later occupied by Bob’s Discount Furniture and other uses. By the 2010s, the mall (now strictly a collection of exterior storefronts) continued to attract retailers. A Baby R Us/Toys R Us operated for several years in the immediate vicinity (until that chain’s 2018 closure), and other fashion, pet supply, and fast-casual dining tenants rotated through the center. In 2017, Sears finally closed its Dedham Mall store after 50 years of operation. With Sears gone, the large two-story anchor building on the north end of the complex became available for re-use. In 2019, At Home opened in the lower level of the former Sears building. The upper level of the old Sears building was rebuilt for a Burlington department store (formerly Burlington Coat Factory) opened later in October 2019.

== Current operations ==
The current Dedham Mall site’s layout is that of an open-air power center, though it is still noticeably derived from the mall's former enclosed design. Lowe’s, built in 2005, occupies the south end of the center as a standalone building with its own parking area. The Stop & Shop supermarket is housed in a large one-story building at the northeast section of the property. The former mall’s central corridor has been replaced by a parking field and landscaped drive aisles connecting the different store entrances. In commercial real estate terms, it is classified as a grocery-anchored power center, with approximately 510,000 square feet (47,000 m^{2}) of retail space (as of 2021). Notably, the Dedham Mall’s transformation positioned it to complement the nearby Legacy Place lifestyle center (opened in 2009) rather than compete directly – Dedham Mall focuses on big-box and convenience retail, whereas Legacy Place offers high-end shops as well as entertainment, and effectively restored the regional mall role that the Dedham Mall formerly served.

The ownership of Dedham Mall has changed hands as the real estate value of open-air centers rose. The Wilder Companies, after managing and co-owning the mall for over a decade, agreed to sell the property in 2021 to RPT Realty, a NY-based real estate investment trust, for around $131.5 million. The Dedham Mall was acquired by Kimco Realty upon their acquisition of RPT Realty in January 2024 and currently lists the property under the name Dedham Pointe despite the site continuing to use the Dedham Mall name in official documents.

== List of anchors ==
Store	Opening Date	Closing Date	Notes
Sears	1967	2017	Original anchor; remained open through the decline; replaced by At Home (lower level) and Burlington (upper level).
Bradlees	1967	2001	Original anchor; space later demolished for Lowe’s redevelopment.
Stop & Shop	1967	Early 1990s	Original supermarket; closed during decline. A new Stop & Shop later built elsewhere on the site (mid-2000s).
Woolworth's	1967	1997	Mid-mall five-and-dime store; included a luncheonette. Closed with chain's national liquidation.
Old Navy	1999	Present	Added during late 1990s revitalization; exterior-facing store; still operating.
DSW	Early 2000s	Present	Shoe retailer; opened after mall de-malling, exterior entrance.
Lowe’s	2005	Present	Built on former Bradlees footprint during redevelopment into open-air center.
Dick’s Sporting Goods	Late 2000s	Present	Added during redevelopment phase.
T.J. Maxx	1990s	Present	Transitioned from mall interior to outward-facing.
At Home	2019	Present	Occupies lower level of former Sears building.
Burlington	2019	Present	Occupies upper level of former Sears building.

== See also ==
- Swansea Mall - former enclosed mall in Swansea, Massachusetts, that has been converted into a strip mall
- New Harbour Mall - former enclosed mall in Fall River, Massachusetts, that has been converted into a power center
