= Peter Dierks Joers House =

Historic house in Arkansas, United States

- U.S. National Register of Historic Places
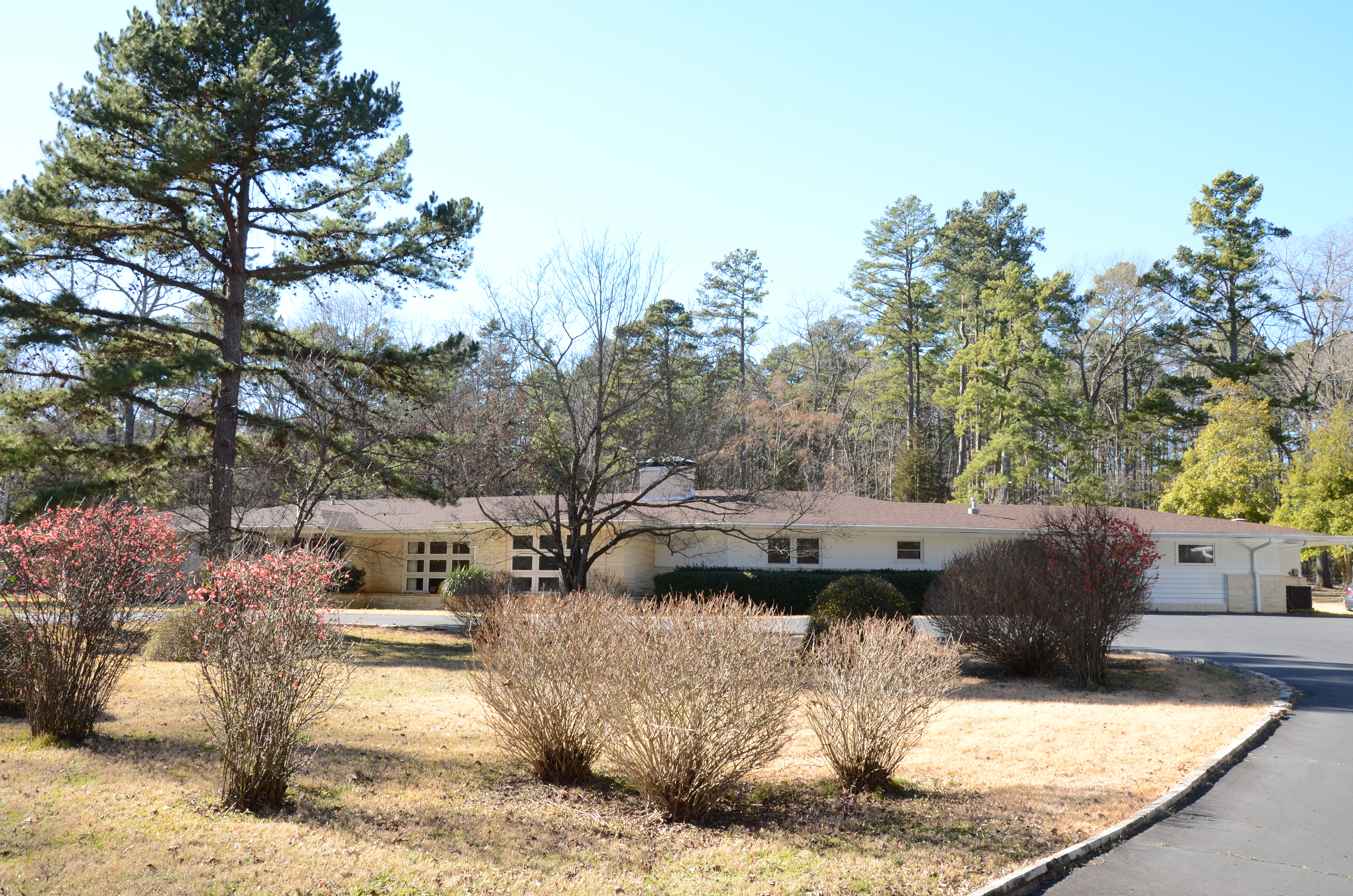

- Location within Arkansas Location within the United States
- Location: 2111 Park Ave., Hot Springs, Arkansas
- Coordinates: 34°32′43″N 93°1′32″W
- Area: 6 acres (2.4 ha)
- Built: 1955
- Built by: Hal Anderson
- Architect: E.A. Sibley, E.A.
- Architectural style: Modern Movement, Ranch house
- NRHP reference No.: 09000773
- Added to NRHP: November 4, 2009

The Peter Dierks Joers House is a historic house at 2111 Park Avenue in Hot Springs, Arkansas. Built in 1955, this single story wood and limestone structure is one of the finest local examples of Mid-Century Modern / Ranch architecture. The house is basically U-shaped, with a central public living area, a bedroom wing, and a service wing. Windows are typically full length in height, and most of the exterior is clad in irregularly-laid limestone, with some weatherboard siding. The house was built for Peter Dierks Joers, heir to the locally prominent Dierks Lumber Company, whose sale to Weyerhaeuser he oversaw. The house interior is a showcase of Arkansas wood types and woodwork.

The house was listed on the National Register of Historic Places in 2009.

== See also ==
- National Register of Historic Places listings in Garland County, Arkansas
