= Amazon Books =

Bookstore chain by Amazon.com

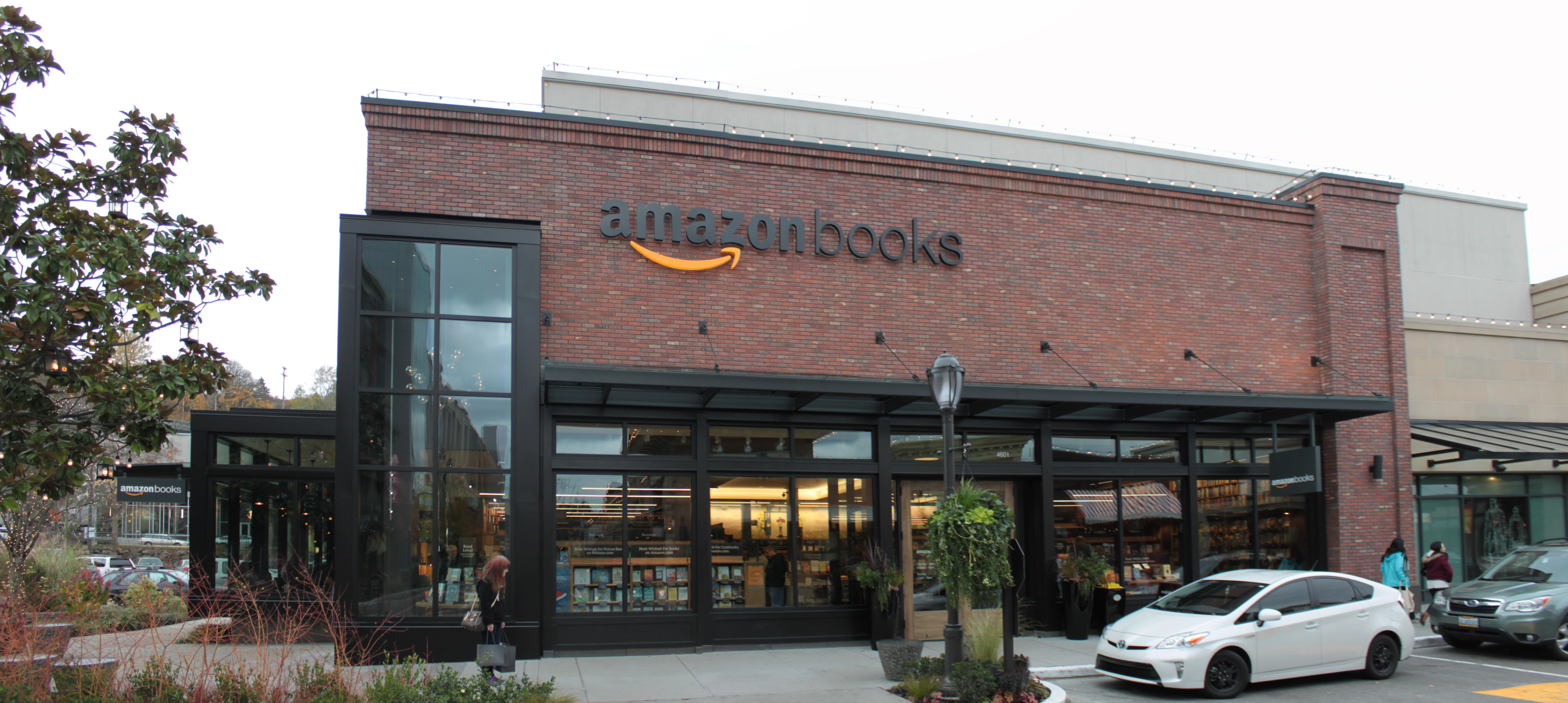
- The first Amazon Books store, in Seattle, Washington
- Type: Subsidiary
- Industry: Retail
- Founded: November 2, 2015; 11 years ago
- Defunct: 2022; 4 years ago
- Products: Books; Amazon Echo; Amazon Kindle; Kindle Fire; Amazon Fire TV; Amazon Basics
- Parent: Amazon
- Website: amazon.com/amazonbooks

Amazon Books was a chain of retail bookstores owned by online retailer Amazon. The first store opened on November 2, 2015, in Seattle, Washington. On March 2, 2022, it was reported that all Amazon Books would close on various dates in the future.

== Products ==
The initial store in Seattle stocked approximately 5,000 titles, with books displayed cover-outward to showcase authors and their work, prioritizing this presentation over space efficiency. The shelves featured positive reviews and star ratings from the Amazon.com website, and prices were aligned with those available online.

The store also sold Amazon electronics, including the Amazon Kindle e-book reader, the Kindle Fire tablet series, the Amazon Echo, and the Amazon Fire TV. Two locations of Amazon Books had a cafe.

== History ==
The first Amazon Books store opened on November 2, 2015, located at the University shopping center in Seattle, Washington. The store has been described as the first permanent store from Amazon, who opened pop-up shops and pickup outlets on several university campuses in 2015. In February 2016, tech news website Re/code reported that longtime Amazon executive Steve Kessel was leading the retail store initiative, having previously been part of the team to launch the first Amazon Kindle e-reader. During development of the project, it was referred to as "Project Anne" in filings with the city.

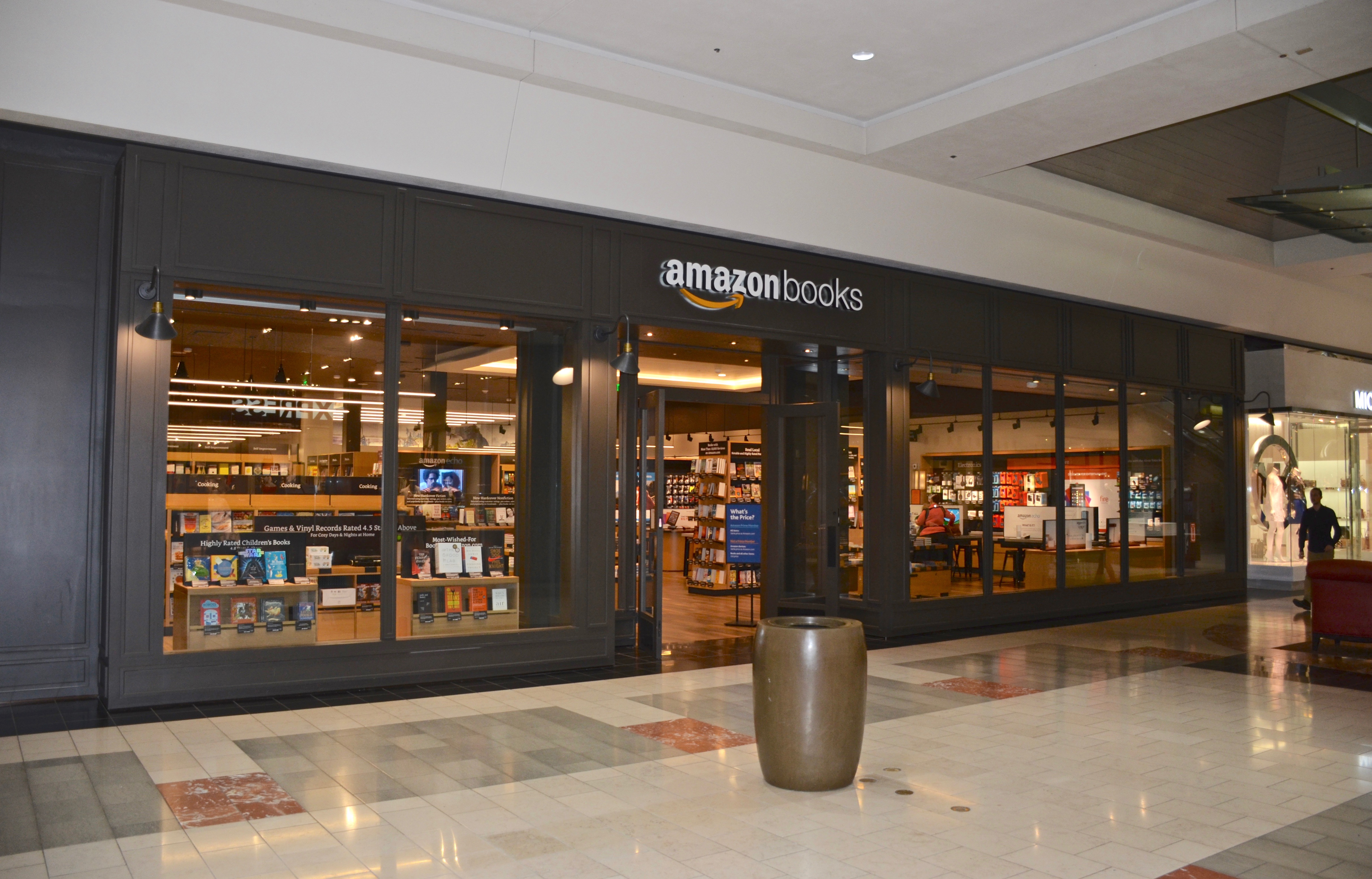
Amazon Books opened its third store in the Washington Square mall in the Portland metropolitan area.

On February 2, 2016, a CEO of a shopping center owner claimed that Amazon planned to open as many as 400 bookstores; the statement was retracted by the company the following day.

Amazon Books' second store opened on September 7, 2016, in San Diego, California,. It was followed by openings at Washington Square near Portland, Oregon, Legacy Place in Dedham, Massachusetts, Chicago, New York City, and Paramus, New Jersey. Other stores in New York City, Bellevue, Washington, Atlanta, Georgia, Pacific Palisades (Los Angeles) were expected to open between 2017 and 2019.

In November 2016, Amazon Books began charging non-Amazon Prime members a separate price for books and other non-electronic products, while Amazon Prime members retained the online price-matched rate.

On March 2, 2022, it was reported that all Amazon Books would close. In addition to the bookstores, Amazon will close its 4-star and pop up stores on various dates in the future.

== Reception ==
Local bookstores in the Seattle area described wariness over the physical presence of Amazon.com, with the University Book Store in the U District noting "different spending patterns" two months after the opening of Amazon's store; an Amazon spokesperson dismissed the notion that Amazon Books would interfere with independent bookstores and their operations, stating that "offline retail is a big space with room for lots of winners." The executive vice president of Half Price Books, a national chain of new and used bookstores, saw the interest that Amazon is showing in expanding brick-and-mortar bookstores as something good for the industry, stating in February 2016 that it was a sign that the "printed word isn't dead."

After the announcement of a third store in Portland, Oregon, CEO Miriam Sontz of local bookstore Powell's Books stated that Amazon's move to open physical stores was an acknowledgement that "something special occurs in a physical bookstore that is not replicable online" and that Portland was "filled with book lovers and book buyers", quoting bank robber Willie Sutton's quip that he targeted banks "because that's where the money is."

The New Yorker, covering the first New York City store opening at Columbus Circle, called it in a headline "Not Built for People Who Actually Read," continuing to say the store is "designed to further popularize, on Amazon, that which is already popular on Amazon." The store resembles its online marketplace, with signs such as "Most-Wished For on Amazon.com" and bestseller category rankings. Kyle Chayka described Amazon Books as "the opposite of independent bookstores" and that it was "driven wholly by the market and whatever provoked attention".
