= East Ludington Avenue Historic District =

- U.S. National Register of Historic Places
- U.S. Historic district
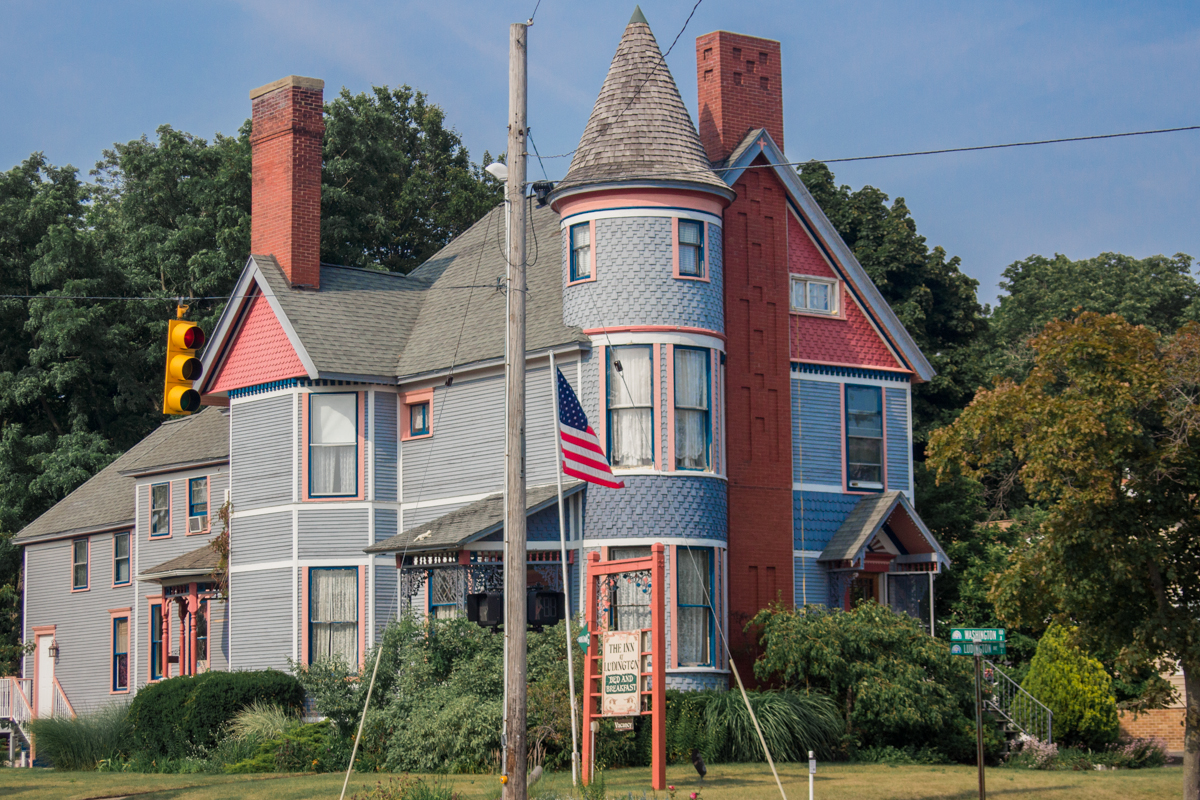
- Frank N. and Fannie Allen Latimer House (701 East Ludington)

- Location within Michigan Location within the United States
- Interactive map
- Location: 400-800 blks. East Ludington Ave., Ludington, Michigan
- Coordinates: 43°57′20″N 86°26′24″W
- Built: 1872
- Architectural style: Queen Anne, Neoclassical, Colonial Revival, Craftsman, Contemporary, Ranch houses
- NRHP reference No.: 100007920
- Added to NRHP: July 8, 2022

The East Ludington Avenue Historic District is a residential historic district located in the 400-800 blocks of East Ludington Avenue in Ludington, Michigan. It was listed on the National Register of Historic Places in 2022.

== History ==
Ludington began as a lumber mill town, with the first plat recorded in 1867. Plats were extended down what is now East Ludington Avenue, and what is now the East Ludington Avenue Historic District was fully platted out by 1871. Ludington itself grew rapidly, and soon had a number of wealthy residents connected to the lumber trade. Many of these chose East Ludington Avenue to build their fashionable homes, including Michael J. Danaher (403 East Ludington), Antoine E. Cartier (501 East Ludington), Nellie and H.B. Smith (710 East Ludington), Daniel W. Goodenough (706 East Ludington), Emery D. Weimer (510 East Ludington) and James Foley (702 East Ludington).

As the 20th century approached, timber resources dwindled, and Ludington's economy diversified, first with the addition of salt manufacturing, then, later in the 1910s and 20s, as a railroad hub and manufacturing center. This diversification brought new people to the area, with Ludington's population doubling from 4,190 people in 1880 to 8,898 people by 1930. The new boom brought more wealthy residents to East Ludington Avenue, including Wilmer T. Culver (701 East Ludington), Joseph F. Shalmark and his wife, Esther, (707 East Ludington), August H. Lidberg and his wife, Alma (709 East Ludington), Clay F. Olmsted and his wife Ada Mae (504 East Ludington) and Edward Rohrmoser (806 East Ludington). Into and after the Great Depression, these industries also began to decline. However, after World War II, more local tourism came to Ludington, helped in part by the rise of the personal automobile. To serve these tourists, more motels were constructed in the area, including two in the district: the Dancz Motel (414 East Ludington) and the Four Seasons Motel (717 East Ludington). Tourism increased in the 20th century, and as it drew to a close, a number of the homes in the district were converted to bed and breakfasts.

== Description ==
The East Ludington Avenue Historic District stretches along five blocks of East Ludington Avenue, and contains 89 buildings, 64 of which contribute to the historic character of the district. These include the separately NRHP-listed Warren A. and Catherine Cartier House, as well as the Michigan historic sites Daniel W. Goodenough House and Frank N. and Fannie Allen Latimer House. The district is primarily residential, although it includes a small number of professional buildings. The contributing buildings were constructed between 1872 and 1959. The houses vary in size and architectural style, and include large ornate Queen Anne, Neoclassical, and Colonial Revival houses as well as more modest Craftsman, Contemporary, and Ranch houses. Several the larger houses have been converted into bed and breakfasts or professional offices, and two motels are also contained within the district.

== Gallery ==
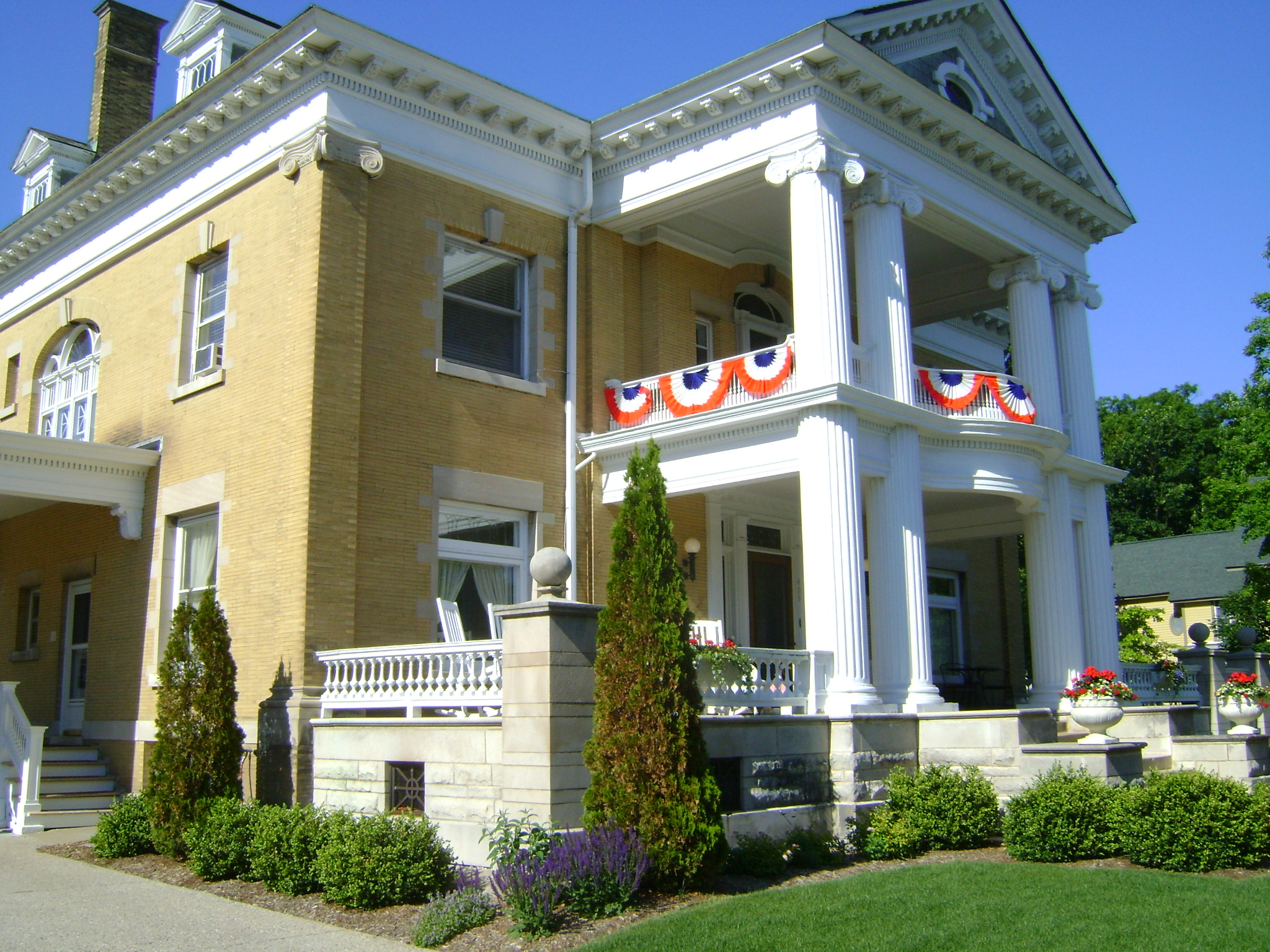
Warren A. and Catherine Cartier House (409 East Ludington)

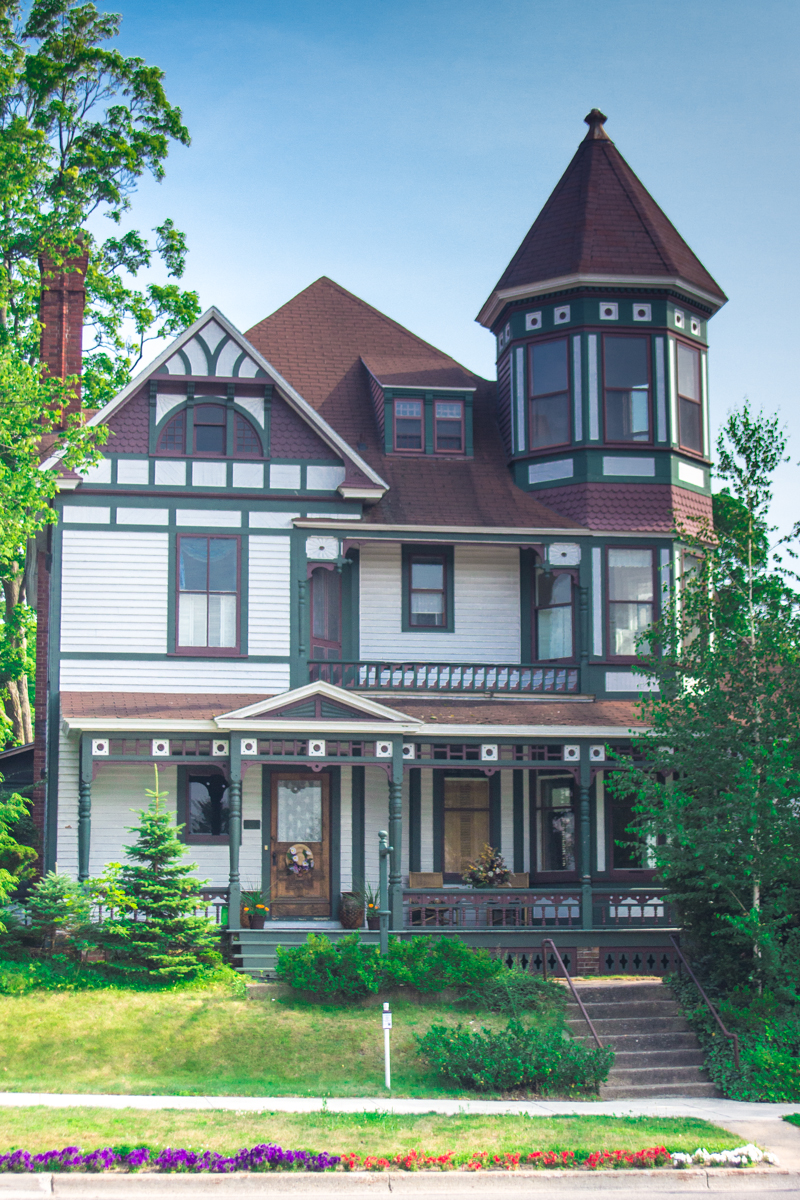
Daniel W. Goodenough House (706 East Ludington)
