= Splanch =

Type of single-family home

A splanch is a type of single-family home that was popular in the New York metropolitan area from the 1950s through the 1970s. The name – coined by real estate lawyer and businessman Henry Albert Klar and his company – is a fusion of split level home and ranch, two architectural styles that influenced the design.

== Typical layout ==
Splanch Main Level

Splanch Upper Level

A splanch is not a ranch, and it is not a split level. Rather, it is a three-level house inside of a two-level skin. Typically, they are a center-hall type of home, built on a slab. On the ground level, there is a garage in front, loaded from either the side or the front of the house. Garages were one or two bays, depending on the size of the splanch. Opposite the garage and the center foyer, was a formal dining room and an eat-in kitchen. Behind the garage, elevated up half a level, was the living room, which faced the backyard. Behind the kitchen, and on the same level as the kitchen, was a den, often outfitted in wood paneling, and was adjacent to the elevated living room. Stairs rise up from the foyer to the living room, then turn, and rise up to the second (or third) floor, which contains the bedrooms. The bedroom hallway is open to the stairs and living room below. Four and five bedroom models are commonplace, yet smaller three bedrooms examples exist.

Because the house was built on a slab, the space underneath the family room was pushed down half a level, creating a daylight basement similar to those found in a split-level or bi-level, and often contained a recreation room. The remainder of the first floor sits directly on the slab. The design, which is speculated to have originated on Long Island's South Shore / Nassau County, lacks a full basement because high water tables existed in the area. Developers were only able to dig down 3 or 4 feet for the footings of the house because of the water table. Though its exact origin remains unknown, the splanch gained popularity in the 1960s. Its range expanded from the South Shore to the North Shore, across Long Island, and into the suburban areas of New Jersey, Westchester, Rockland, and Orange Counties. Splanches can be found elsewhere, but are not common.

== Advantages ==
The main advantage of the splanch is that it contains a large amount of living space, including a garage, with a relatively modest footprint. The raised living room almost always benefits from a sloped cathedral ceiling. Also, the elevated living room can also benefit from improved views out the back. The den boasts a then-innovative pass-through to the kitchen, and the kitchen has direct access to the dining room as well as the garage. Internal circulation is reduced via the split central staircase, and it eliminates long corridors that often plague other housing styles.

== Disadvantages ==
The main complaint from splanch owners is that the elevated living room is not an integral part of the house. Isolated on its own floor, the living room becomes its own, infrequently used entity. For lack of a better use, owners have converted it into a pool room or even a master bedroom suite. Additionally, since the house does not have a full basement, storage space can be at a premium. Some splanch houses have been modified to the point where the house lacks its original mid-century style or aesthetic.

== Construction ==
Construction materials often consisted of a CMU (cinder block) foundation, and the concrete slab of the main floor. Wood construction rose above the slab. The exterior was treated in a number of ways. Typically, the main level facing the street was clad in a brick veneer, with the second story clad in oversize cedar shakes. The two sides and rear were often clad in a wide-exposure asbestos or cementitious horizontal siding. However, any combination of exterior finishes exist, from stone, to stucco, to cedar.

The splanch's popularity diminished in the 1980s, and few examples exist that were built in that decade, and by the 1990s, they were gone from the drawing board altogether. Presently, many are updated and renovated to suit the needs of their current owners.

== See also ==
- List of house types
