= Martin Kimmel =

American businessman and philanthropist (1916–2008)

- Born: Martin S. Kimmel; April 9, 1916; New York City, U.S.
- Died: April 15, 2008 (aged 92); New York City, U.S.
- Occupations: Real estate developer, philanthropist
- Spouses: Gloria DeHaven (m. 1953; div. 1954): Claudia Aronow (m. 19??; div. ????); Helen Lyttle (m. ????)
- Children: 1
- Relatives: Donald Aronow (former father-in-law); Leelee Sobieski (daughter-in-law)

Martin S. Kimmel (April 9, 1916 – April 15, 2008) was an American real estate developer and philanthropist who co-founded Kimco Realty Corporation, the largest builder of strip malls in the United States.

== Early life and education ==
Kimmel was born to a Jewish family in the Bronx on April 9, 1916, one of four sons of Henry and Emma Kimmel. His father, Henry Kimmel, managed a family-run lighting fixture store. After wiring many new buildings, he started buying property and built many multi-family residential buildings in New York City. Kimmel attended Syracuse University but left to serve in the Army during World War II in the Pacific theater. Upon returning to the US, he worked with his father at the lighting store, and then for the construction company Henry Kimmel and Sons, where he learned about the homebuilding industry. Based with this knowledge, he started his own company on Long Island which built garden apartments.

== Career ==
Using the profits from his construction business on Long Island, Kimmel and his friend, Milton Cooper, moved to Florida and founded the Kimco Realty Corporation in 1958. Kimco derives its name from the surnames of the two founders. They correctly presaged that Florida was in the midst of transitioning from a vacation destination to a retirement haven. Their first investment was a small strip mall with two stores attached to a Zayre's. Sticking to the same formula - focusing on strip developments in new subdivisions (often following utility trucks out to find new developments - they were wildly successful and over the next thirty years, Kimco's portfolio grew to over 1,900 properties of which 1,100 were strip shopping centers. Their business expanded internationally and included properties in Canada, Mexico, Chile and Brazil. The company went public in 1991 raising $128 million becoming the first Real Estate Investment Trust (REIT) IPO in history.

Kimmel retired in 1991 to focus on philanthropic activities.

== Philanthropy ==
Kimmel was an important benefactor of New York University donating $10 million in 2005 and $15 million in 2006 to fund the Helen and Martin Kimmel Center for Stem Cell Biology, creating a professorship of molecular immunology, and contributing to the construction of the Helen and Martin Kimmel Center for University Life which houses the Skirball Center for the Performing Arts. Kimmel is also a significant contributor to the Weizmann Institute of Science in Rehovot, Israel funding the Helen and Martin Kimmel Institute for Magnetic Resonance, the Helen and Martin Kimmel Center for Molecular Design, the Helen and Martin Kimmel Hyperbaric & Advanced Wound Healing Center, and the Kimmel Center for Archaeological Science. Kimmel was a long time supporter of the Jewish Museum in New York City.

Kimmel served as a trustee of New York University Langone Medical Center.

== Personal life and death ==
Kimmel was married three times:

- In 1953, he married American actress and singer Gloria DeHaven. They divorced in 1954.
- His second marriage was to Claudia Aronow, a New York artist and daughter of boat designer and racer Donald Aronow. They later divorced. They had one son together, menswear designer Adam Kimmel who is married to the actress Leelee Sobieski.
- His third marriage was to Helen Lyttle.

In addition, Kimmel has several stepchildren: stepdaughter Betsy Karel of Washington; stepdaughter Abby Leigh of Manhattan; and stepson Alexei Hay of Manhattan. Kimmel was a member of Temple Emanu-El in New York City.

Kimmel died April 15, 2008. In November 2008, his wife Helen donated $150 million toward construction of a new patient pavilion at the NYU Langone Medical Center in honor of her late husband.
