= High Ranch =

American domestic architectural style

High Ranch is an American style of house, also known as Split entry , Hi-Ranch, Bi-Level Ranch and Raised Ranch.

== Style ==
A High Ranch style house differs from Ranch-style house in that the accommodation is split across two floors. The entry is usually between the two floors with a half stair leading to the top floor and a half stair down to the lower floor. The lower floor can be ground level, half underground with windows, or a full basement, though it is not referred to as such.

The upper floor usually contains the main living areas: the kitchen and general dining area, as well as formal dining area, main reception and bedrooms as well as one or more bathrooms. The downstairs may contain a family room, laundry, storage, another bedroom and exits to the garage and rear garden, depending on grade. The lower floor may instead actually contain the garage or garages.

== Build ==
High Ranch houses can be new build, or an existing ranch-style that has been raised on jacks and had a new floor inserted underneath.
