= The Birchwood Organization =

Defunct real estate company based in Mineola, New York

- Company type: Private
- Industry: Real estate development
- Founded: 1946
- Founder: Morris Sosnow; Leonard R. Schwartz
- Defunct: 2007
- Fate: Acquired by Kimco Realty
- Headquarters: Mineola, New York

The Birchwood Organization – also known as the Birchwood Development Company, Birchwood Development, Birchwood Park Homes, or simply Birchwood – was a major, family-owned American real estate development and management firm of the 20th and early 21st centuries, that operated primarily on Long Island, in New York, United States.

== Description ==
Throughout its existence, Birchwood developed over ten thousand residential units – primarily on Long Island, New York – and multiple commercial developments. The developments ranged in size, with the largest developments – including Birchwood Park at Jericho – consisting of upwards of over two thousand single-family homes.

The housing developments created by the Birchwood firm typically had names beginning with "Birchwood," using the brand and firm for marketing. Many of the residential units were designed by Queens-based architect Stanley H. Klein.

At the time of its purchase in 2007 by Jericho-based Kimco Realty, Birchwood had developed and maintained a portfolio of tens of thousands of single-family homes and co-ops, as well as dozens of retail and commercial developments.

The Birchwood Organization was headquartered in Mineola, in Nassau County.

== History ==
The company was founded in 1946 by Long Island-based developers Morris Sosnow and Leonard R. Schwartz, with a goal of building new, affordable housing on Long Island – including for returning veterans. The duo, through their new firm, soon thereafter embarked on one of the company's first major projects: a 40-unit development in North Valley Stream, in Nassau County.

In the 1950s, the firm developed one of its largest and best-known developments: the 2,600-home Birchwood Park at Jericho development in Jericho, Nassau County. At the time, Jericho was primarily farmland, with sparse development. The company purchased approximately 760 acres (310 ha) of this land, constructing the new development in its place and contributing to the hamlet's transformation into a large, master-planned suburban community.

In the 1960s, Morris Sosnow and fellow Long Island Developer, Gilbert Tilles, jointly developed the 137-acre (55 ha) Nassau Crossways business park in Syosset, Nassau County.

Beginning in the 1960s, Birchwood also planned and built condominium and mixed-density developments – including Birchwood Park at Bretton Woods in Coram, Suffolk County, and the Birchwood at Water's Edge neighborhood of in Bayside, Queens; Water's Edge consists of three high-rise apartment towers overlooking Little Neck Bay, along with several low-rise units.

In 2006, it was announced by Morris Sosnow's estate that Birchwood would be sold by the family to Kimco Realty – a major, American real estate investment trust and development firm based in Nassau County in a $92 million deal that was completed the following year, in 2007. Upon purchasing Birchwood, Kimco assumed ownership and maintenance responsibilities at all acquired commercial properties in Birchwood's portfolio – including its Birchwood Plaza and Jericho Atrium centers in Jericho.

== See also ==
- Country Estates, Inc.
- The Klar Organization
- Levitt & Sons
- Toll Brothers
