= The Klar Organization =

Real estate development company headquartered in East Meadow, New York, United States

- Type: Private
- Industry: Real estate development
- Founded: 1947
- Founder: Henry Albert Klar
- Headquarters: East Meadow, New York
- Key people: Steven Klar (President)
- Website: www.klarrealty.com/index.html

The Klar Organization (also known as Klar Realty, Klar Homes, Klar, and historically as Henry A. Klar Realty) is an American real estate development and marketing firm best known for its residential developments throughout the New York metropolitan area.

== Description ==
Headquartered in East Meadow, New York, the Klar Organization is a family-owned company that develops and markets real estate developments. It primarily markets and develops residential homes and neighborhoods, primarily specializing in the sales and development of single-family residences, townhomes, and condominium and cluster-type developments. It is one of the largest home-building firms based on Long Island.

Klar is also known for constructing affordable housing and retirement communities.

As of 2026, the President of The Klar Organization is Steven Klar.

== History ==
=== Early years, 1947–1975 ===
The Klar Organization was established as a real estate company in Bayside, Queens, in 1947, as Henry A. Klar Realty. Founded by Jewish businessman and real estate attorney Henry Albert Klar, the company soon began selling homes to veterans and families, and working with developers as their sales agent – in addition to coining the name "splanch" for the then-new type of house, which had risen to popularity in the metropolitan area about that time. In 1954, the growing company opened a branch office in Huntington, in Suffolk County.

By the early 1950s, Klar Realty was the sales agent for large-scale developments being built across Long Island by major developers. Among the developments were the Creative Homes-developed Freeport Terrace development in Freeport with 110 homes, the 55-home Hilltop Estates development in Syosset, and the Merrickana Apartments in Jamaica, Queens.

In 1969, Klar moved to its present headquarters on Hempstead Turnpike (NY 24) in East Meadow.

In 1975, Henry Klar retired as President – which, by then, had sold in excess of 40,000 housing units – and handed the company to his son, Steven Klar, who subsequently renamed the firm as The Klar Organization.

=== The Klar Organization, 1975–present ===
Following Steven Klar becoming the company's president, The Klar Organization began to plan and build residential developments of its own – with a focus on condominiums, single-family homes, cluster-type developments, affordable housing, and 55-and-over communities – by the early 1980s, with early developments including the second half of The Summit at High Point condominium development in the Village of North Hills. The company also continued marketing developments and homes and serving as the sales agent for other developers' projects, such as for The Birchwood Organization and its Birchwood at Bretton Woods condominium development in Coram.

By the 1990s, the company was continuing to market, develop, and sell housing units and developments, in addition to acquiring developments from banks after their original developers declared bankruptcy, including the 500-unit Waterways at Moriches development – a 55-and-up community originally planned by Waterways Development Corporation. Other developments planned, built, and completed by Klar during this time included The Links at North Hills (located within the Village of North Hills), Long Meadow (located within Dix Hills), and Pond's Edge at Muttontown (located within the Village of Muttontown).

By the 2000s, the company – by then among the largest of its type on Long Island – began expanding off Long Island, targeting Upstate New York and Florida as additional markets to develop and open new offices within. The company also completed the 500-unit Waterways at Moriches community about this time. This trend continued into the 2010s and 2020s, with new developments including Hidden Ridge at Scarsdale in Scarsdale, and Willow Wood at Overton Preserve in Coram.

== See also ==
- The Birchwood Organization
- Levitt & Sons
- PluteGroup
- Toll Brothers
