= Split-level home =

Style of house

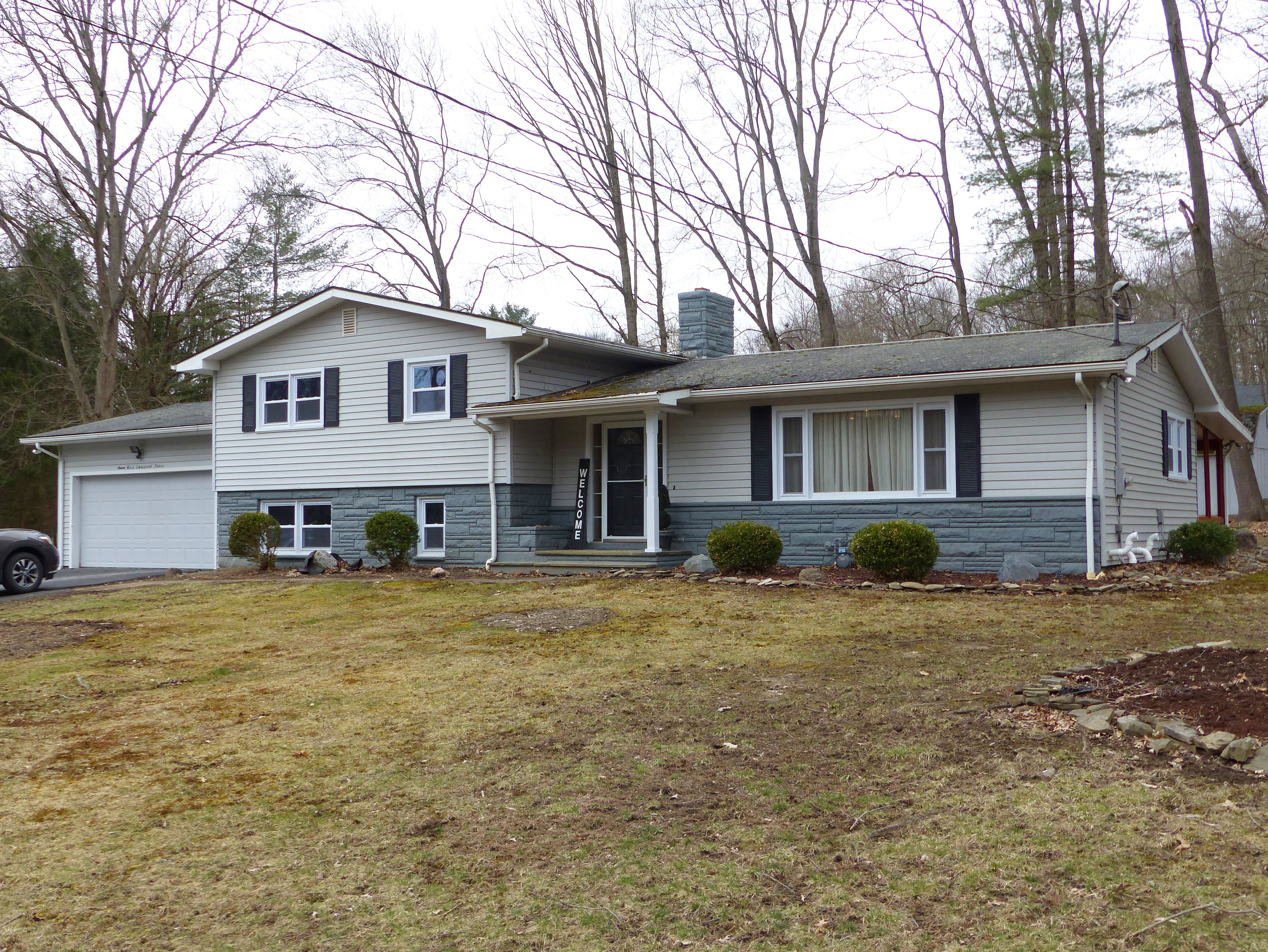
Split-Level House

A split-level home (sometimes called a tri-level home) is a style of house in which the floor levels are staggered. There are typically two short sets of stairs, one running upward to a bedroom level, and one going downward toward a basement area.

== History ==
The style gained popularity in North America during the mid-20th century, as the suburbs expanded, beginning in the years after the second World War, and has remained a popular housing style from the 1950s onward.

== Styles ==
=== Sidesplit ===
An example of a sidesplit-style home

A sidesplit is a split-level home configuration where the multiple levels are visible from the front elevation. Typically, the garage is on one side of the house and there is a floor above the garage housing the bedrooms. The other half of the house is the main living area, part of a storey above the garage level and part of a storey below the bedroom level. Grading or steps connect the exterior street to the front door on the main level.

The advantage of sidesplits (and its closely related backsplit) is that it separates bedrooms from living space without the need for a full flight of stairs. It is less land-efficient than a two-storey house but more efficient than a bungalow.

Most sidesplits have a crawl space that is half the size of the house such that the foundation is the same for both halves of the "split" house. Some others may have a split foundation with a full basement below even the lower main living area.

=== Backsplit ===
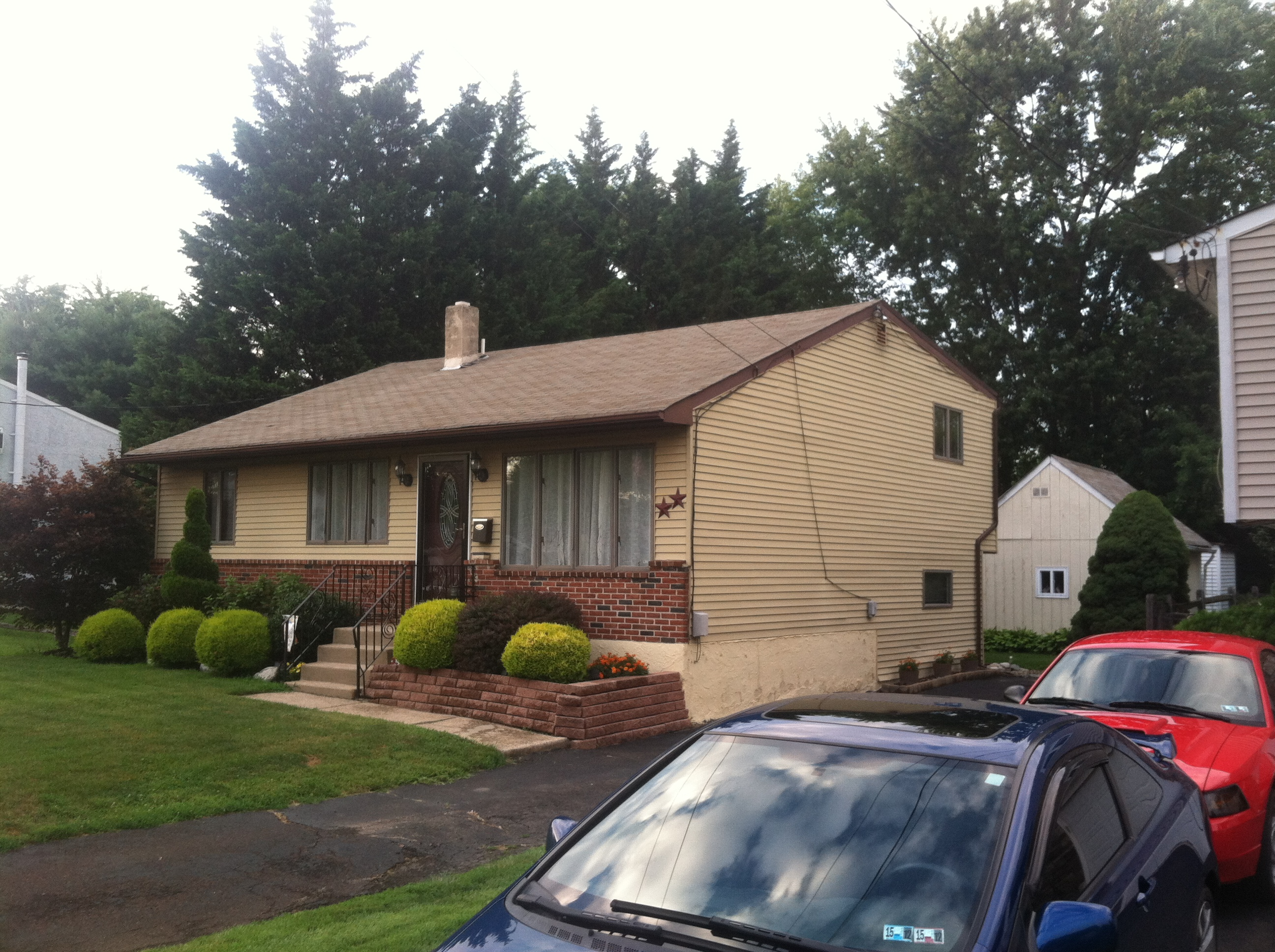
An example of a backsplit-style home

A backsplit is where the split level is only visible from the side elevation. The front elevation shows only a single storey and the two stories are in the back.

=== Bi-level ===
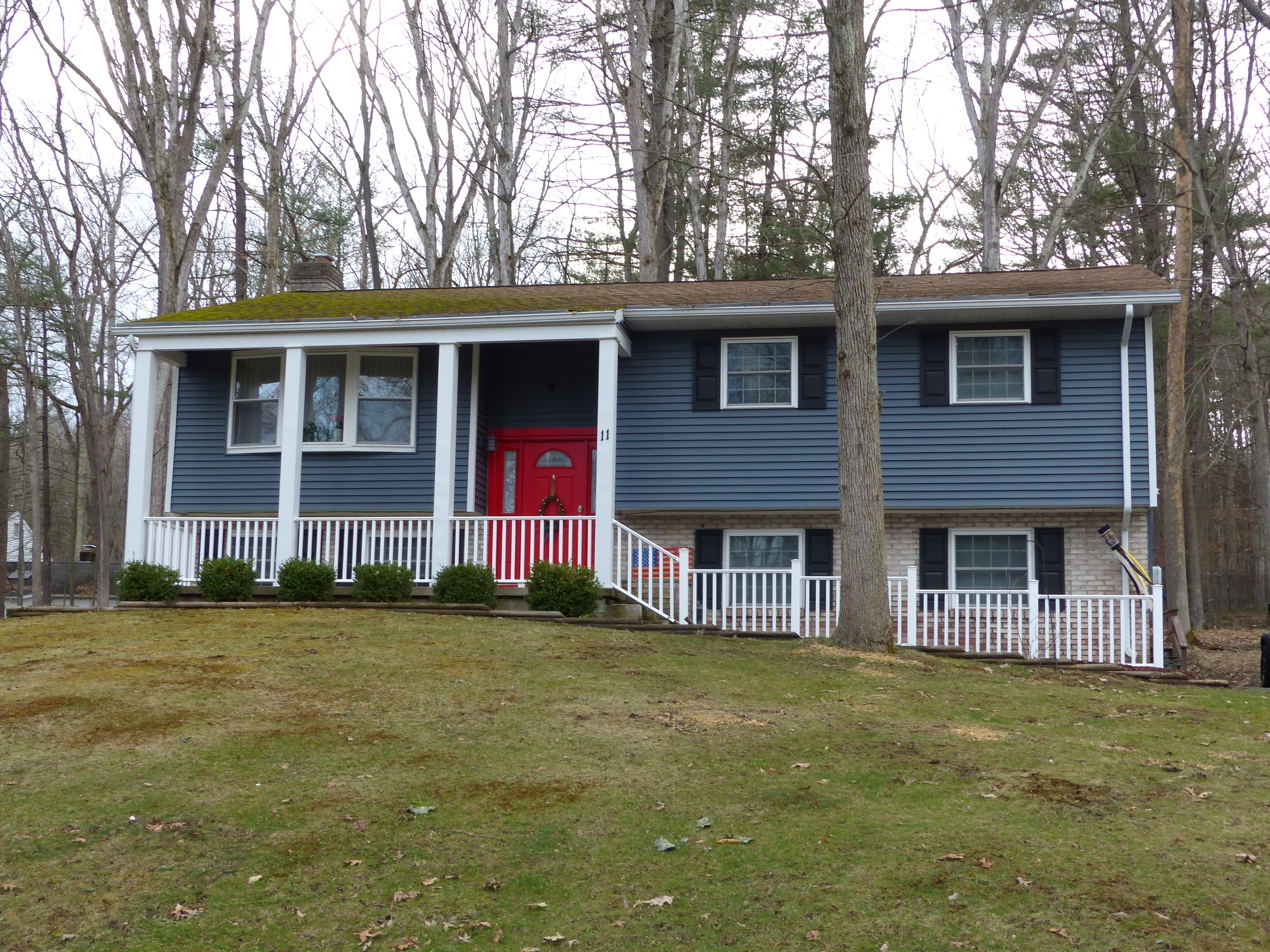
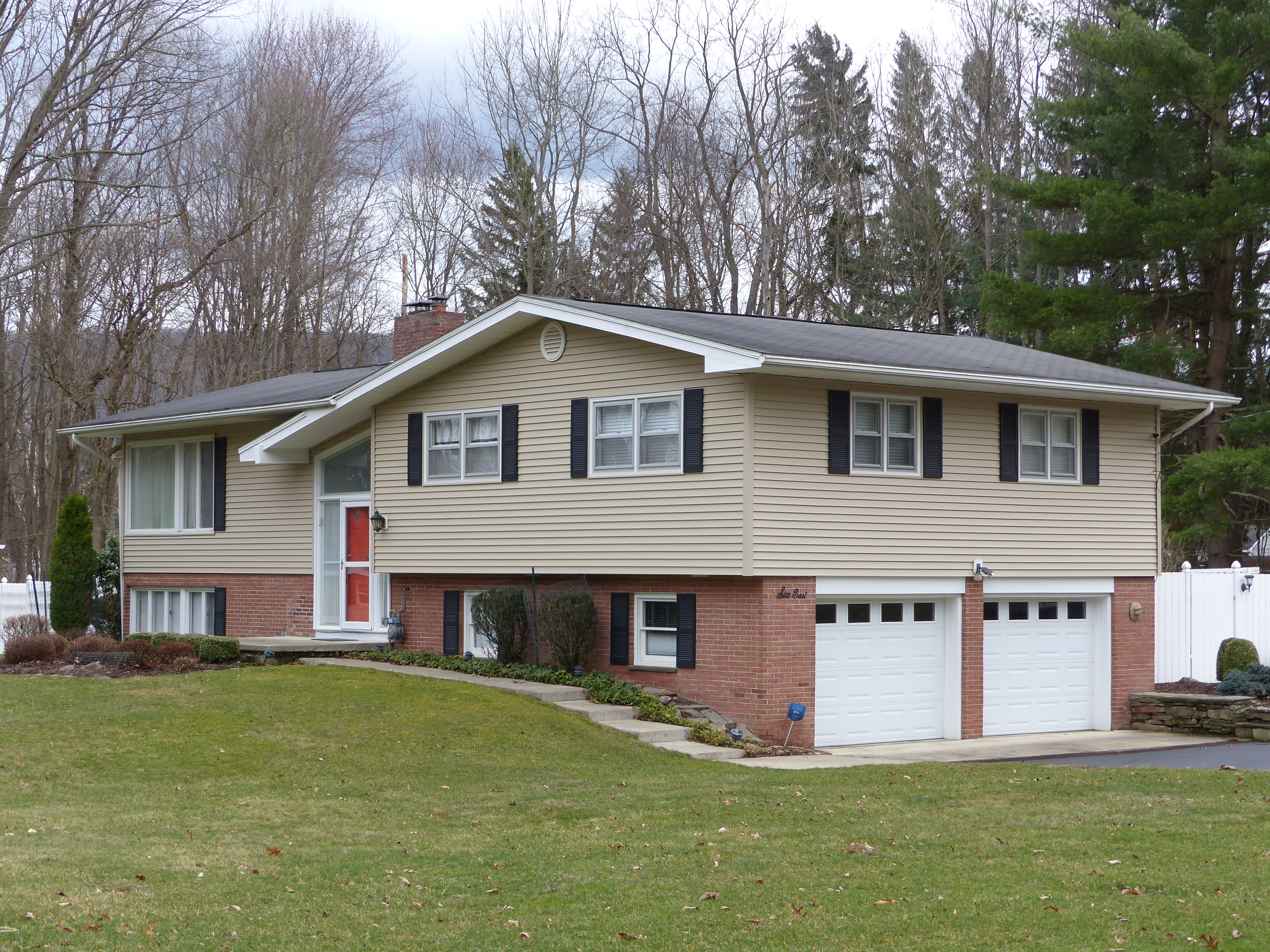
Examples of bi-level style homes

A bi-level includes two short sets of stairs and two levels. The entry is between floors. The front door opens to a landing. One short flight of stairs leads up to the top floor; another short flight of stairs leads down. The top floor tends to be full height ceilings with the living room, dining room, kitchen, bedrooms and bathrooms. The lower floor often has lower ceilings and is partially below ground. However, in many modern split-foyer homes, the lower level is at grade, which necessitates an outdoor staircase to reach the front door. These homes often have very high ceilings on the lower level to accommodate the home's HVAC ducting.

A modified bi-level home has a garage attached at the front of the bi-level, not under it. The front entry is larger with room for groups of people to enter and a closet. (This change addresses the major complaint about the cramped front entry space.) The garage entry also opens into the front entry. The modification is the addition of another level above the garage using a third short flight of steps going up from the great room area to additional bedrooms or a master bedroom with en suite.

=== Stacked split level ===
The stacked split level has four or five short sets of stairs, and five or six levels. The entry is on a middle floor between two levels. The front door opens into a foyer, and two short sets of stairs typically lead down to a basement and up to a living area (often the kitchen or the living room). Another short set of stairs typically leads to at least one bedroom, located on top of the first living area. Often additional bedrooms are "stacked" on top of the second living area, hence the name "stacked split level". This type of construction is typically used for townhouses.

=== Split entry ===
The split entry has two short sets of stairs (usually five or six steps per stairway) and is a one level improvement with a basement. The entry is "between" the floors. Per FNMA/FHLMC regulations the lower level is defined as a basement even if finished. Usually the basement level is "walk out". A split entry has a different look than a raised ranch from the outside as the front entry door lines up to the front windows differently. A variation of the split entry is called the "front to back split" in which there are two upper levels.

=== Raised ranch ===
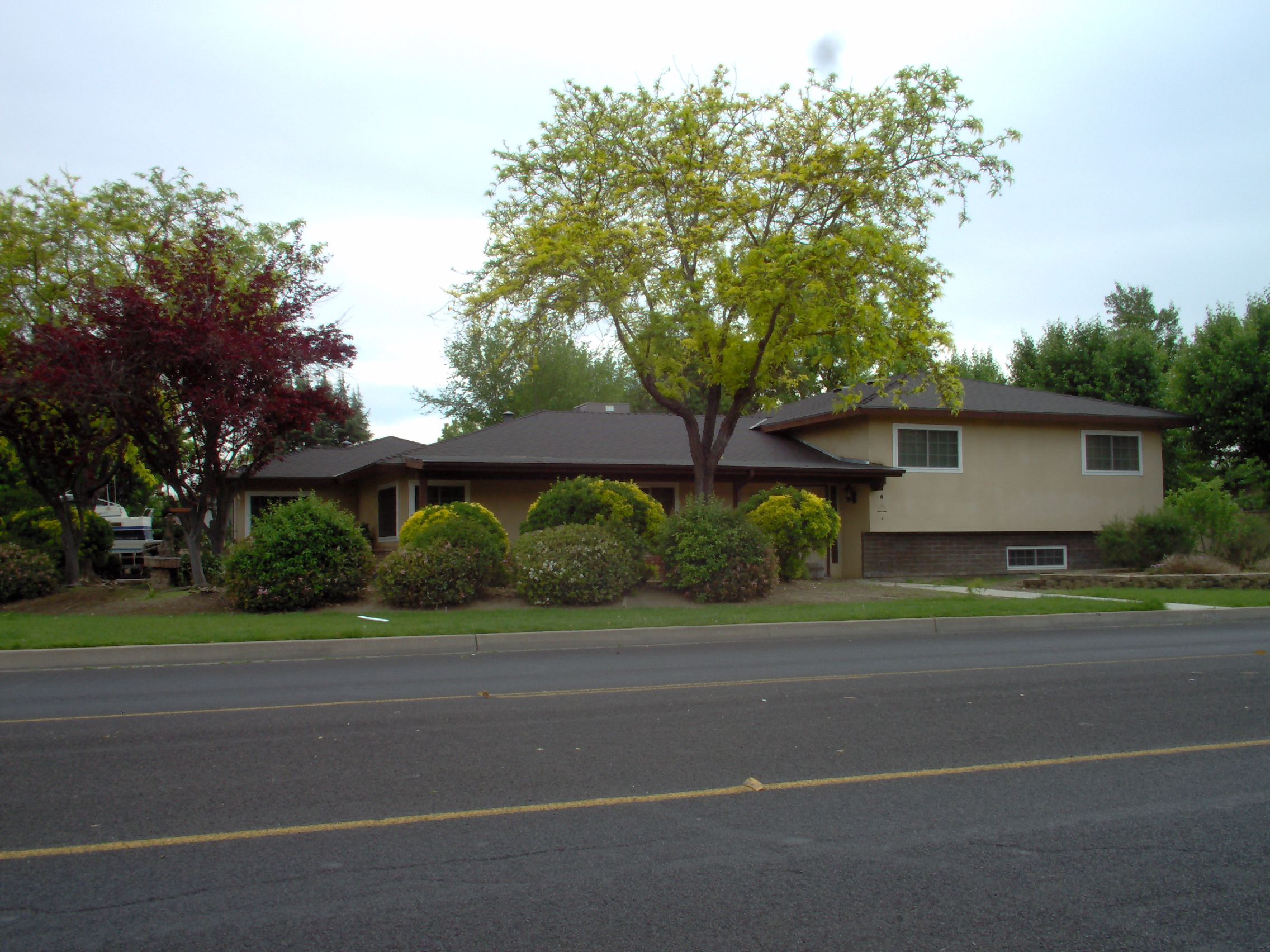
An example of a raised ranch-style home

The raised ranch includes a basement on the bottom and a "full set of stairs" (a full flight of stairs, usually 12 or 13) which leads to the first level. A raised ranch has a different look on the front than a split-entry as the front door lines up to the front windows differently. The front door entry is predominately at the lower floor. The top floor per FNMA/FHLMC is the living area and the lower floor is the basement, even if finished.

=== Split level ===
The split level has two or three short sets of stairs, and three (tri-level) or four (quad) levels. The entry is on a middle floor between two floors. The front door opens directly into what is usually the formal living area, which is typically partially above ground level. Below that may be a small crawl space. The lower level is a finished area partially underground (approximately three feet below grade) and must have an outside entry door. Above the lower level are bedrooms. Sometimes a short flight above the bedroom floor is another single bedroom. Above that is typically an attic accessed by either another flight of stairs or an opening placed high in a closet. A typical tri-level appears to be a lowered colonial on one side of the house and a ranch on the other side with a crawl space below the ranch. A typical quad-level appears to be a lowered colonial on one side of the house and a ranch on the other side with a basement below the ranch.

== Regional variance in usage ==
In some regions, such as the Northeastern United States, the term "split level" can be used to refer to a bi-level house with a split entry. This style of house is also known as a "split foyer". This is a two-storey house that has a small entrance foyer with stairs that "split"—part of a flight of stairs go up (usually to the living room, kitchen, and bedrooms) and part of a flight of stairs go down (usually to a family room and garage/storage area).

== See also ==
- List of building types
- Slope house
- Splanch
- Maisonette
- Ranch-style house
