= Kimco Realty =

American real estate investment trust

Kimco Realty Corporation
- Type: Public
- Traded as: NYSE: KIM; S&P 500 component
- Industry: Real estate investment trust
- Founded: 1966; 60 years ago
- Founders: Milton Cooper; Martin Kimmel
- Headquarters: Jericho, New York
- Area served: Contiguous United States and Puerto Rico
- Key people: Milton Cooper (chairman); Conor C. Flynn (CEO); Glenn G. Cohen (CFO)
- Revenue: ▲US$2.14 billion (2025)
- Net income: ▲US$585 million (2025)
- Total assets: ▼US$19.7 billion (2025)
- Total equity: ▼US$10.4 billion (2025)
- Owner: Milton Cooper (1.6%)
- Number of employees: 717 (2024)
- Subsidiaries: RPT Realty
- Website: www.kimcorealty.com

Kimco Realty Corporation – known as Kimco – is a real estate investment trust headquartered in Jericho, New York, that invests in shopping centers throughout the Contiguous United States and the Commonwealth of Puerto Rico.

As of September 30, 2026, the company owned interests in 561 U.S. shopping centers and mixed-use assets comprising 99 million square feet of gross leasable space.

Kimco was the first public vertically integrated REIT designed to be internally managed and advised, providing its own property and asset management.

== History ==
The Kimco Corporation, the predecessor of the company, was founded in 1966 by a group of real estate investors, including Martin Kimmel and Milton Cooper, who merged their retail assets. This asset merger led to the new company being named Kim-co. The company was incorporated in 1973.

In 1988, the company acquired Gold Circle for $325 million.

In November 1991, the company became a public company via an initial public offering, raising $120 million.

In 1998, the company acquired Price REIT for $535 million in stock.

In October 2003, the company acquired Mid-Atlantic Realty Trust for $441 million. A few years later, in 2007, Kimco acquired The Birchwood Organization – another Long Island-based company – for $92 million.

In August 2021, the company acquired Weingarten Realty.

In November 2022, the company acquired a portfolio of eight Long Island, NY shopping centers for $375.8 million.

In January 2024, Kimco acquired RPT Realty, making the company the largest shopping center REIT.

In October 2024, the company acquired Waterford Lakes Town Center for $322 million.

== See also ==
- Vornado Realty Trust
- Economy of Long Island
