= RPT Realty =

Defunct real estate investment trust

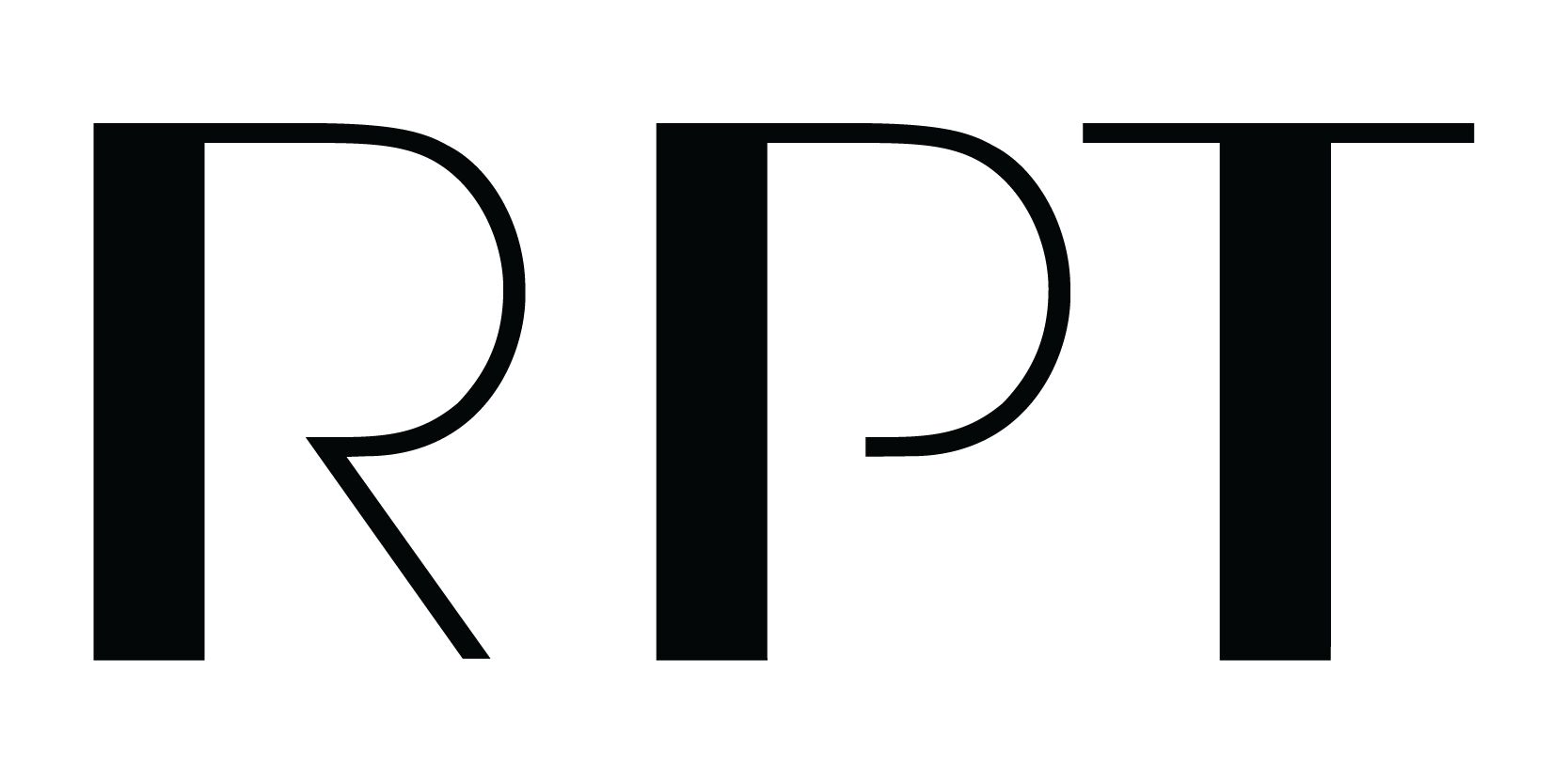
- Company type: Private (1975–1996); Real estate investment trust (1996–2024); Subsidiary (2024–present)
- Industry: Shopping centers
- Founded: 1975; 51 years ago
- Founders: Dennis Gershenson; Michael Ward; Joel Gershenson; Richard Gerhsenson; Bruce Alan Gershenson
- Defunct: January 2, 2024; 2 years ago (as an independent entity)
- Fate: Acquired by Kimco Realty
- Headquarters: New York, NY
- Key people: Brian Harper, CEO
- Products: Open-air shopping centers
- Revenue: ▲$2`7 million (2022)
- Net income: ▲$84 million (2022)
- Total assets: ▲$1.946 billion (2022)
- Total equity: ▲$978 million (2022)
- Number of employees: 138 (2022)
- Parent: Kimco Realty (2024–present)

RPT Realty is a real estate investment trust that owns and operates open-air shopping centers. As of December 31, 2022, the company owns 44 wholly owned shopping centers, 13 shopping centers owned through its grocery anchored joint venture, and 48 retail properties owned through its net lease joint venture comprising 15 million square feet. In 2024, the company was acquired by Kimco Realty. The company was formerly known as RAMCO Properties Trust and Ramco-Gershenson Properties Trust.

== History ==
In 1955, Aaron & William Gershenson founded A & W Management Company.

In 1975, William Gershenson's four sons, Joel, Dennis, Richard, and Bruce Alan, along with Mike Ward, founded Ramco Gershenson, with each partner responsible for a different division of the Company. In the late 1970s and early 1980s, the company developed 35 Kmart stores.

In 1996, the company merged with RPS Realty Trust and became a public company via a reverse merger, changing its name to Ramco-Gershenson Properties Trust.

In 2004, the company acquired 7 properties for $138.3 million.

The company changed its name to RAMCO in May 2018 and RPT Realty in October 2018.

On January 2, 2024, the company was acquired by Kimco Realty.
