= Legacy Place =

Lifestyle center in Dedham, Massachusetts

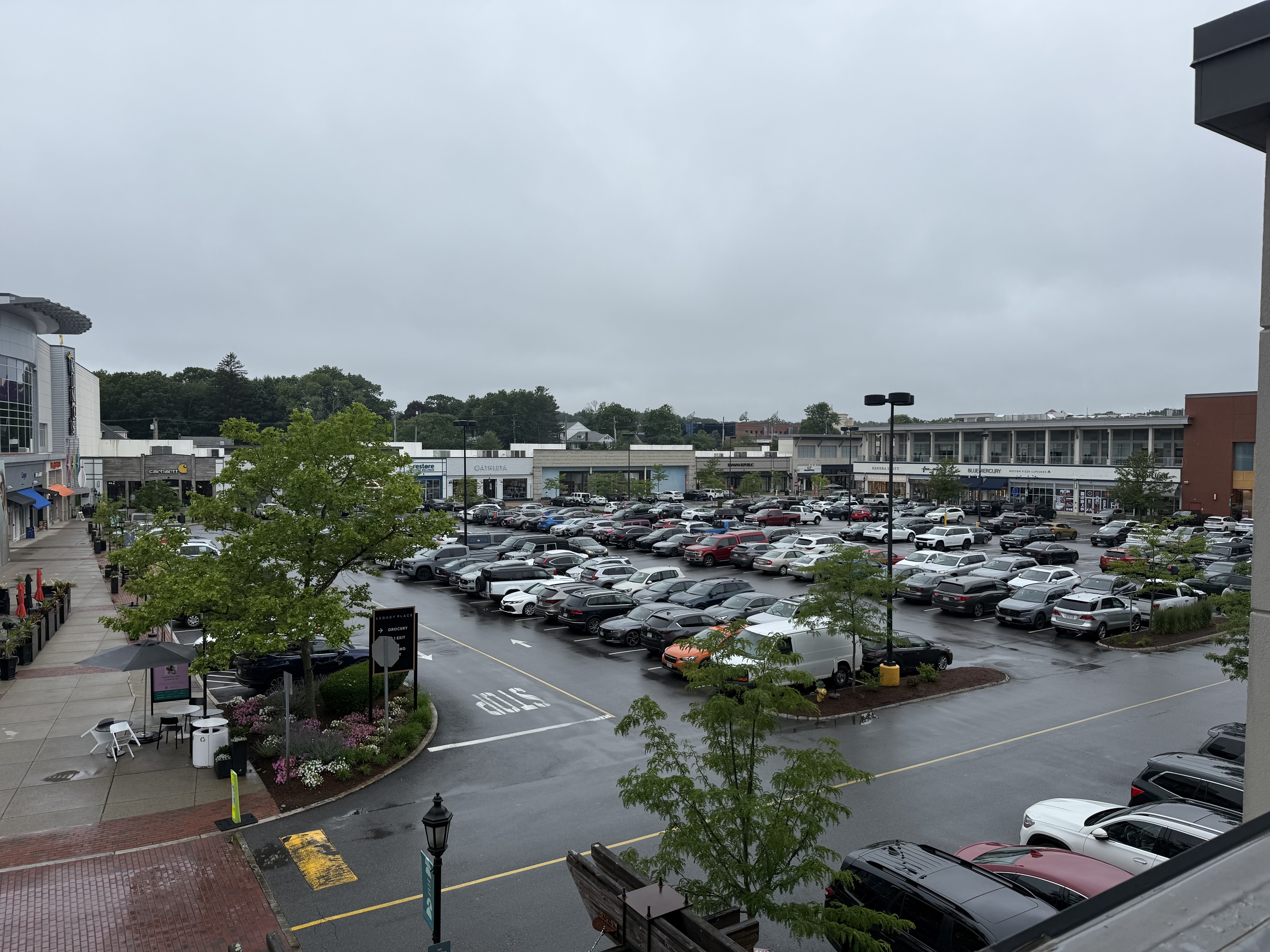
- View of Legacy Place from parking garage in Dedham, Massachusetts
- Location: Dedham, Massachusetts, United States
- Coordinates: 42.2275°N 71.1747°W
- Address: 680 Legacy Place, Dedham, MA 02026
- Opened: August 27, 2009
- Developer: WS Development, National Amusements
- Manager: WS Development
- Owner: WS Development and Madison International Realty
- Architect: Prellwitz Chilinski Associates
- Num. of stores: Approximately 75
- Num. of anchor tenants: 2 (Whole Foods Market, Showcase Cinema de Lux)
- Floor area: 675,000 sq ft (62,700 m²)
- Floors: 1 (retail) and multi-level parking garage
- Parking: 1,400 spaces (structured and surface parking)
- Public transit: MBTA Bus Route 34E, Dedham Corporate Center station
- Website: legacyplace.com

Legacy Place is an open-air lifestyle center located in Dedham, Massachusetts, approximately 15 miles (24 km) southwest of downtown Boston. The center encompasses approximately 675,000 square feet (62,700 m²) of gross leasable area on 37 acres (0.15 km^{2}), and features a combination of retail stores, restaurants, entertainment venues, and office space organized around an outdoor street layout. Anchor tenants include Whole Foods Market, Apple, L.L.Bean, Showcase Cinema de Lux, along with multiple outparcel buildings including Costco Wholesale.

The center was developed by WS Development and National Amusements and opened in 2009 on the site of the former Showcase Cinemas Dedham complex. It is situated at the intersection of Interstate 95 (Route 128) and Route 1A (Providence Highway). It is located approximately 0.5 miles (0.80 km) from the Dedham Corporate Center MBTA Commuter Rail station. Legacy Place primarily serves the towns of Dedham, Westwood, Needham, Norwood, and surrounding communities in Norfolk County.

== History ==
The site now occupied by Legacy Place was originally home to the Dedham Drive-In theater, which opened in 1948 and operated until the late 1970s. In 1973, the Showcase Cinemas Dedham opened adjacent to the drive-in as a three-screen indoor movie theater. The cinema expanded over time, reaching a total of 12 screens by 1991. In the mid-2000s, WS Development, in partnership with National Amusements, initiated plans to redevelop the site into a mixed-use, open-air lifestyle center. The redevelopment was driven by the aging condition of the cinema facilities and the property's strategic location near major highways. The project was also influenced by the conversion of the nearby Dedham Mall into an open-air power center by 2005, which created a market gap for a traditional mall-style shopping center in the area.

The Showcase Cinemas Dedham closed on April 10, 2008, and was demolished in May 2008. Construction of Legacy Place began shortly after the demolition, and officially opened to the public on August 27, 2009. Initial anchor tenants included Whole Foods Market, L.L.Bean, and Showcase Cinema de Lux. The center opened with approximately 50 tenants, with plans for additional openings in the following months. Borders closed in 2011, and its space was later occupied by Barnes & Noble.

In March 2025, Madison International Realty acquired a 50% ownership stake in Legacy Place, entering into a joint venture with WS Development, which continues to serve as the operating and managing partner.

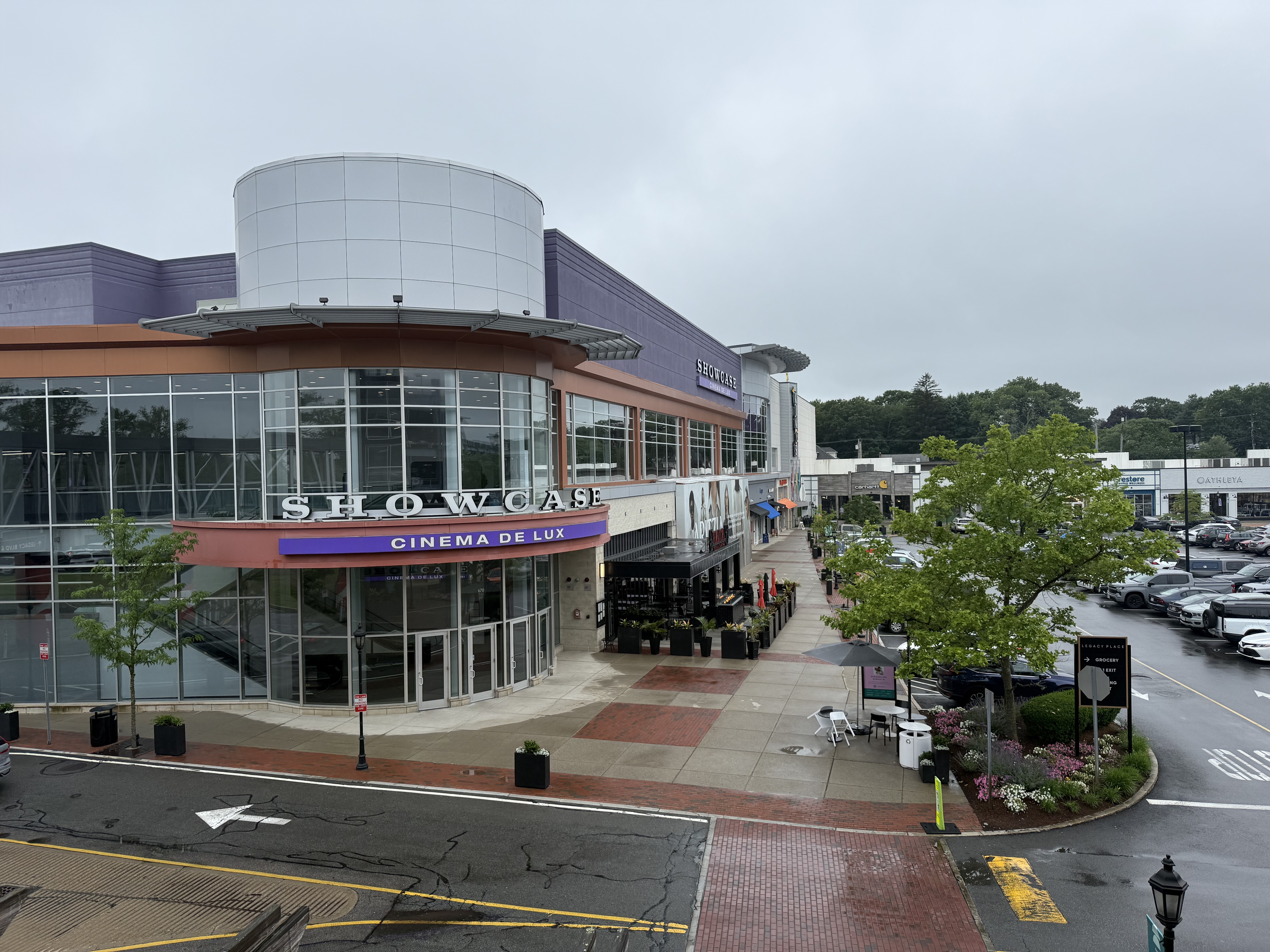
Showcase Cinemas entrance at Legacy Place in 2025.

== Layout ==
Legacy Place is classified as an open-air lifestyle center and is arranged around a network of interior streets and sidewalks, with storefronts facing outward toward landscaped walkways and a central parking lot. The layout incorporates multiple free-standing buildings in addition to the primary retail corridors, with designated parking areas surrounding the site. Parking is free of charge, and spaces are distributed to allow direct access to both anchor tenants and smaller inline stores. A structured parking garage is also located on the southern portion of the site, adjacent to the Showcase Cinema de Lux, to accommodate additional vehicle capacity.

== List of anchors ==
Anchor tenants at Legacy Place
Tenant	Opening date	Notes
Whole Foods Market	August 27, 2009	Flagship grocery store.
L.L.Bean	August 27, 2009	Outdoor and lifestyle retailer offering apparel and gear.
Showcase Cinema de Lux	August 27, 2009	15-screen luxury movie theater with premium seating and in-theater dining.
Apple	September 2009	Full-service Apple Store offering products, technical support, and workshops.
