= Ranch-style house =

American domestic architectural style

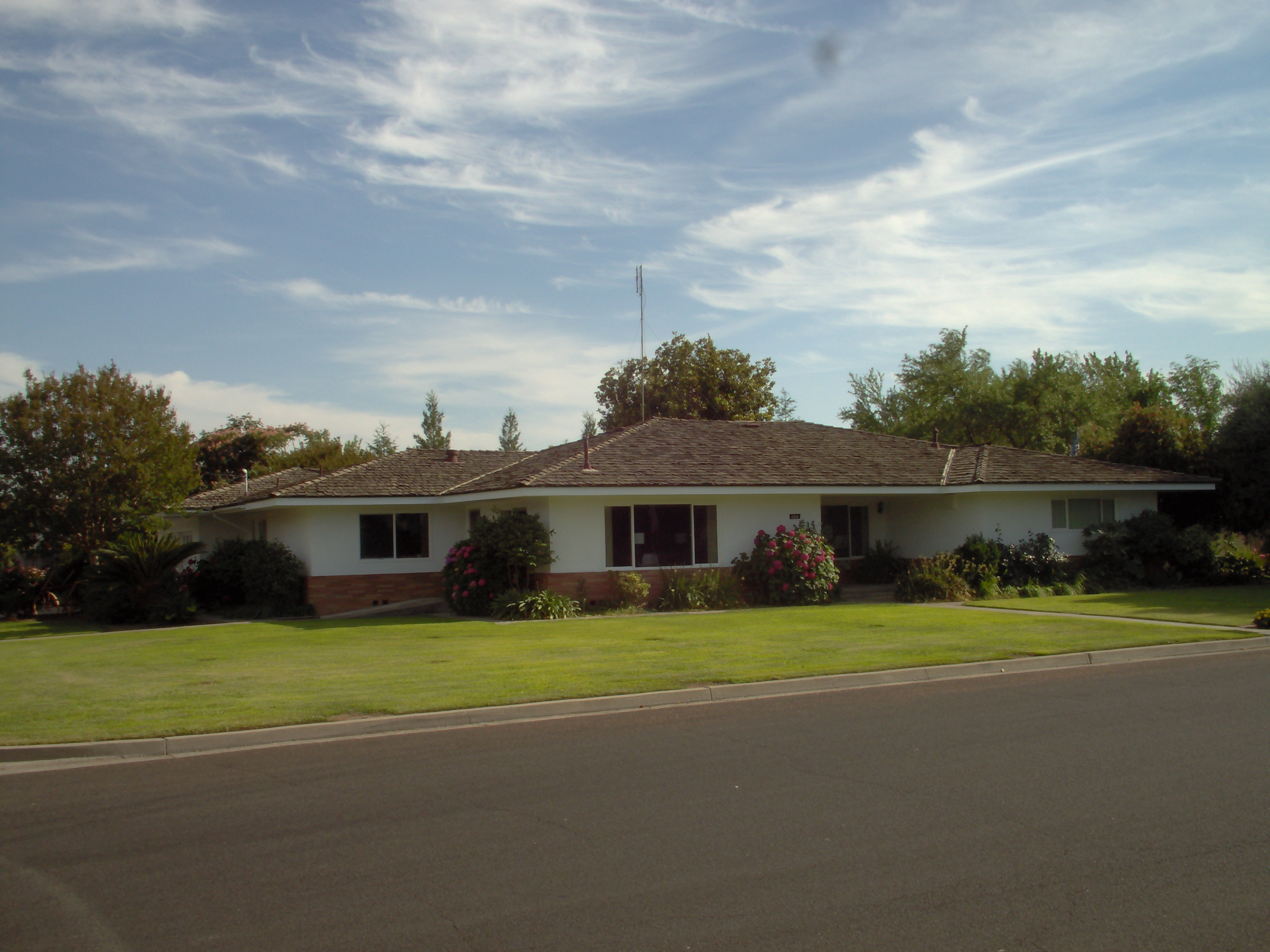
Large custom ranch house built in 1966 in Bakersfield, California. This house exhibits most of the features of the style, such as long low profile and large windows.

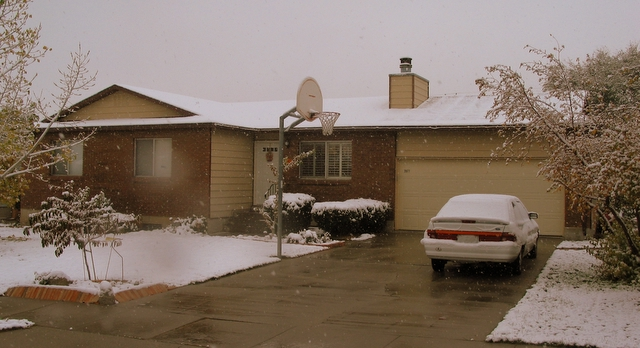
Smaller ranch-style house in West Jordan, Utah, with brick exterior and side drop gable roof

Ranch (also known as American ranch, California ranch, rambler, or rancher) is a domestic architectural style that originated in the United States. The ranch-style house is noted for its long, close-to-the-ground profile, and wide open layout. The style fused modernist ideas and styles with notions of the American Western period of wide open spaces to create a very informal and casual living style. While the original ranch style was informal and basic in design, ranch-style houses built in the United States (particularly in the Sun Belt region) from around the early 1960s increasingly had more dramatic features such as varying roof lines, cathedral ceilings, sunken living rooms, and extensive landscaping and grounds.

First appearing as a residential style in the 1920s, the ranch was extremely popular with the booming post-war middle class of the 1940s to the 1970s. The style is often associated with tract housing built at this time, particularly in the southwest United States, which experienced a population explosion during this period, with a corresponding demand for housing. The style was soon exported to other nations and became popular worldwide. Its popularity waned in the late twentieth century as neo-eclectic house styles featuring historical and traditional decoration became more popular.

Preservationist movements have begun in some ranch house neighborhoods, reinforced by an interest in the style from a younger generation who did not grow up in such homes. This revival has been compared to that which other house styles such as the bungalow and Queen Anne experienced in the twentieth century.

== History and development ==
The 20th-century ranch house style has its roots in Spanish colonial architecture of the 17th to 19th century. These buildings used single-story floor plans and native materials in a simple style to meet the needs of their inhabitants. Walls were often built of adobe brick and covered with plaster, or more simply used board and batten wood siding. Roofs were low and simple, and usually had wide eaves to help shade the windows from the Southwestern heat. Buildings often had interior courtyards which were surrounded by a U-shaped floor plan. Large front porches were also common. These low slung, thick-walled, rustic working ranches were common in what would become the southwestern United States.

=== Era of popularity ===
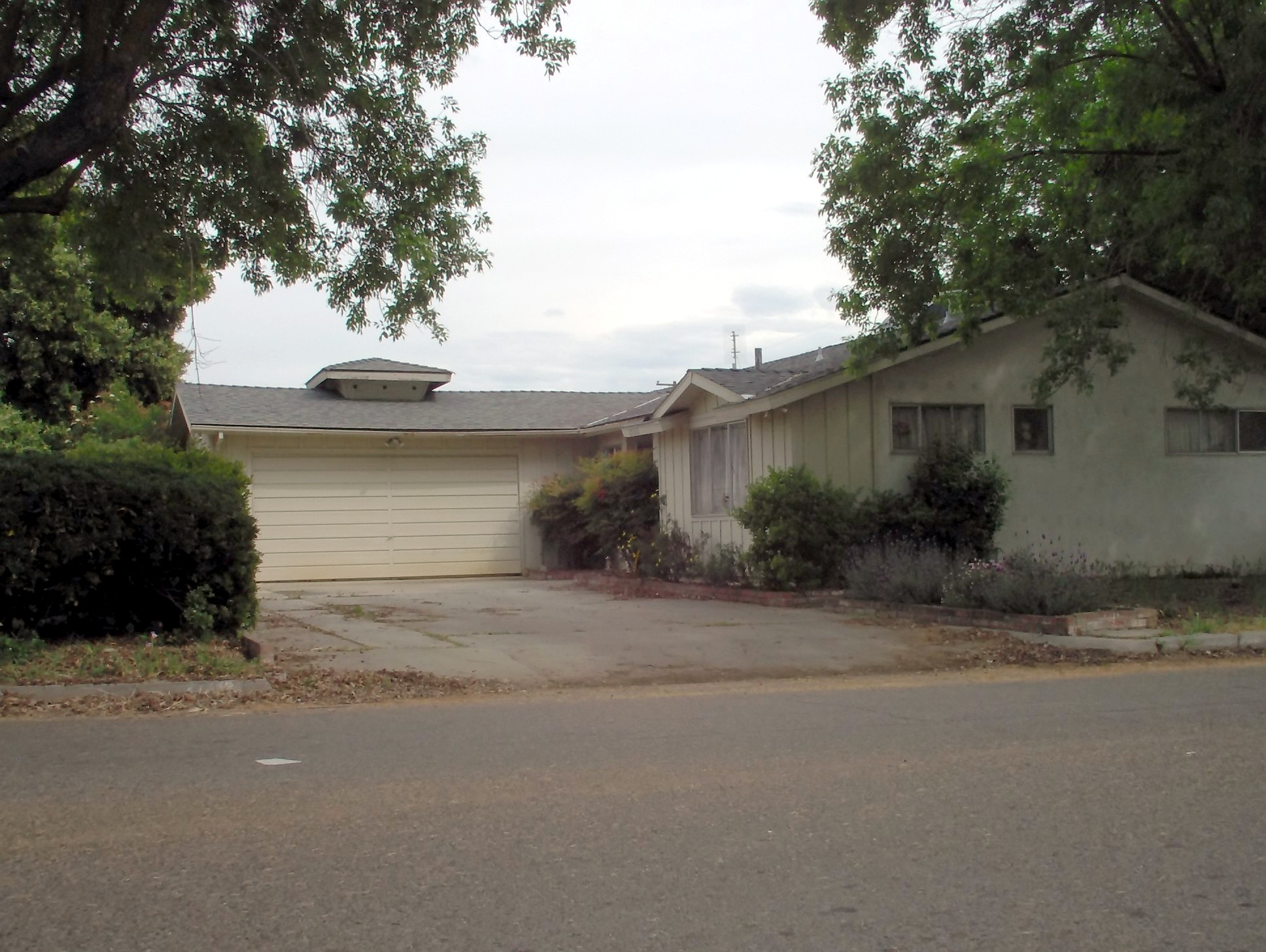
1950s ranch house with dovecote

By the 1950s, the California ranch house, by now often called simply the ranch house or "rambler house", accounted for nine out of every ten new houses. The seemingly endless ability of the style to accommodate the individual needs of the owner/occupant, combined with the very modern inclusion of the latest in building developments and simplicity of the design, satisfied the needs of the time. Ranch houses were built throughout America and were often given regional facelifts to suit regional tastes. The "Colonial Ranch" of the Midwest is one such noted variant, adding American Colonial features to the facade of the California ranch house. From the mid-1960s onward, the ranch house echoed the national trend towards sleekness in design, with the homes becoming even simpler and more generic as this trend continued.

== Features ==
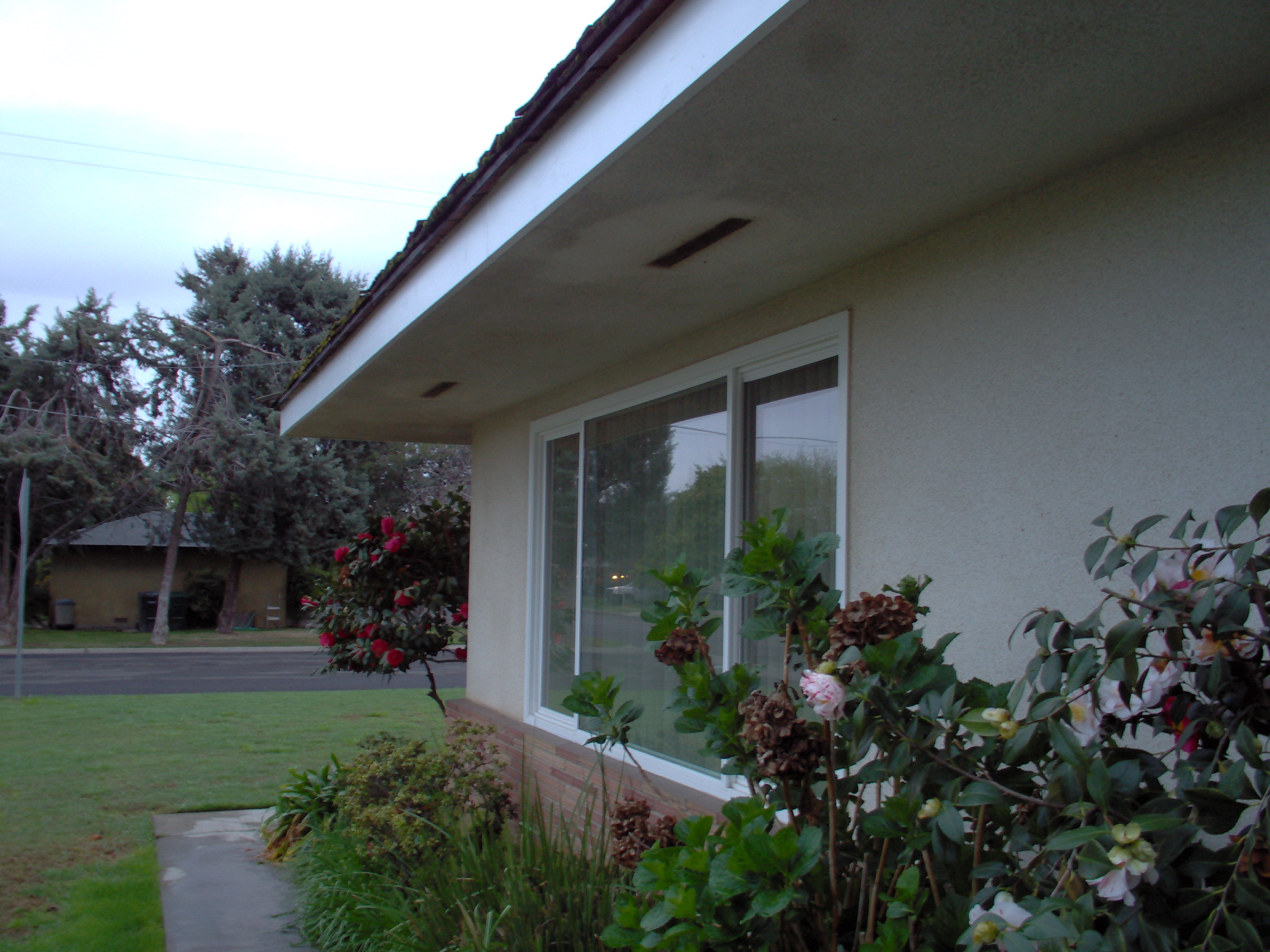
Wide eaves of a typical ranch house, this one built in 1966 in California

Prominent features are of the original ranch house style include:

- Single story
- Long, low-pitch roofline
- Asymmetrical rectangular, L-shaped, or U-shaped design
- Simple, open floor plans
- Living areas separate from the bedroom(s) area
- Attached garage
- Sliding glass doors opening onto a patio
- Windows with a large glass area, sometimes decorated with non-functional shutters
- Vaulted ceilings with exposed beams often in combination with tongue and groove roof decking
- Mixed material exteriors of stucco and brick, wood or stone
- Deep overhanging eaves
- Cross-gabled, side-gabled or hip roof

== Variations ==
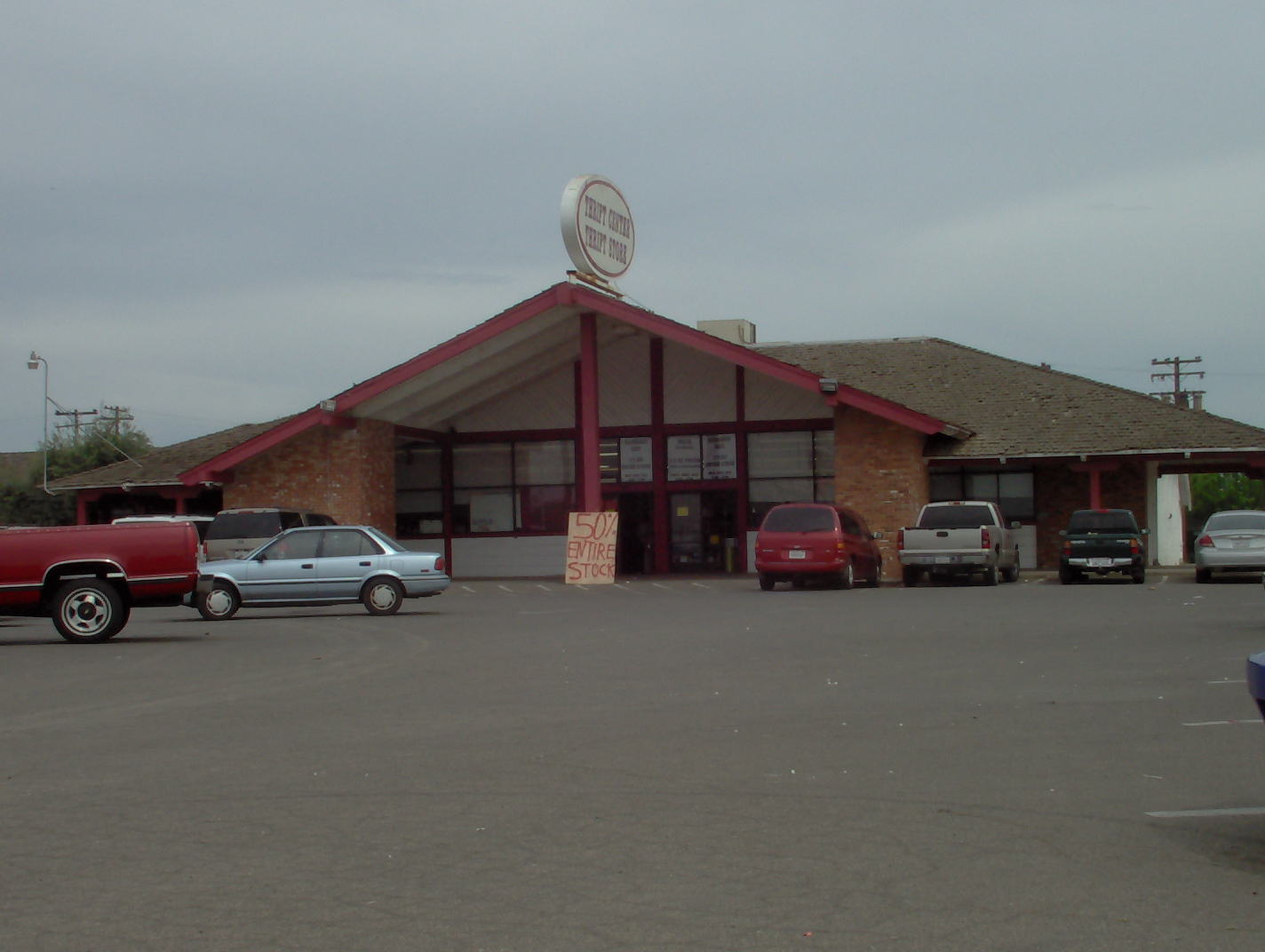
Former supermarket in ranch style

Variants include the California Ranch, Suburban Ranch, Split-Level Ranch, Raised Ranch and Storybook Ranch.

=== Two-story versions ===
The raised ranch is a two-story house in which a finished basement serves as an additional floor. It may be built into a slope to utilize the terrain or minimize its profile. For a house to be classified by realtors as a raised ranch, there must be a flight of steps to get to the main living floor – which distinguishes it from a split-level house.

=== Commercial versions ===
The ranch house style was adapted for commercial use during the time of the style's popularity. As the concept of a "drive-in" shopping center was being created and popularized, the ranch style was a perfect style to fit into the large tracts of ranch homes being built. Commercial ranch buildings, such as supermarkets and strip malls, typically follow the residential style with simple rustic trim, stucco or board and batten siding, exposed brick and shake roofs, and large windows.

=== Decline ===
American tastes in architecture began to change in the late 1960s, a move away from Googie and Modernism and ranch houses towards more formal and traditional styles. Builders of ranch houses also began to simplify and cheapen construction of the houses to cut costs, eventually reducing the style down to a very bland and uninteresting house, with little of the charm and drama of the early versions. By the late 1970s, the ranch house was no longer the house of choice, and had been eclipsed by the neo-eclectic styles of the late 20th century. Very late custom ranch houses of the later 1970s begin to exhibit features of the neo-eclectics, such as dramatically elevated rooflines, grand entryways, and traditional detailing. These neo-eclectic houses typically continue many of the lifestyle interior features of the ranch house, such as open floor plans, attached garages, eat-in kitchens, and built-in patios, though their exterior styling typically owes more to northern Europe or Italy or 18th and 19th century house styles than the ranch house. Neo-eclectic houses also have a significant level of formality in their design, both externally and internally, the exact opposite of the typical ranch-style house. Additionally, the increase in land prices has meant a corresponding increase in the number of two-story houses being built, and a shrinking of the size of the average lot; both trends inhibit the traditional ranch house style. Ranch style houses are occasionally still built today, but mainly in the Western states and, usually, as individual custom.

=== Revival of interest ===
Beginning in the late 1990s, a revival of interest in the ranch style house occurred in United States. The renewed interest in the design is mainly focused on existing houses and neighborhoods, not new construction. Younger house buyers find that ranch houses are affordable entry level homes in many markets, and the single story living of the house attracts older buyers looking for a house they can navigate easily as they age. The houses' uniquely American heritage, being an indigenous design, has furthered interest as well. The houses' simplicity and unpretentious nature, in marked contrast to the more dramatic and formal nature of neo-eclectic houses, makes them appealing for some buyers. The more distinctive ranch houses, such as modernist Palmer and Krisel, Joseph Eichler and Cliff May designs, as well as custom houses with a full complement of the style's features, are in particular demand in many markets. Many ranch-style neighborhoods are now well-established, with large trees, and the houses often have owner modifications that add individual character to the fairly uniform style.

Small-scale tract building of ranch houses ended in the late 1970s and early 1980s. Those still built today have usually been individual custom houses. One exception is a tract of ranch-style houses built on and adjacent to Butte Court in Shafter, California, in 2007/08. These houses borrowed their style cues from the 1950s Western-styled ranch houses, with board and batten siding, dovecotes, large eaves, and extensive porches. All houses in this tract were on 1/4-acre lots, and had their front garages turned sideways so that the garage doors were not dominating the front of the house.

Breaking Bad creator Vince Gilligan specified that Walter White's house in the television series be a Rancher. In an early draft of the script for the series' pilot episode, he described the house as "a three-bedroom RANCHER in a modest neighborhood. Weekend trips to Home Depot keep it looking tidy, but it'll never make the cover of 'Architectural Digest'." The real house used to film exteriors in the series is located in Northeast Albuquerque, New Mexico, and was originally built in 1972. It has since become a popular tourist attraction.

== Gallery ==
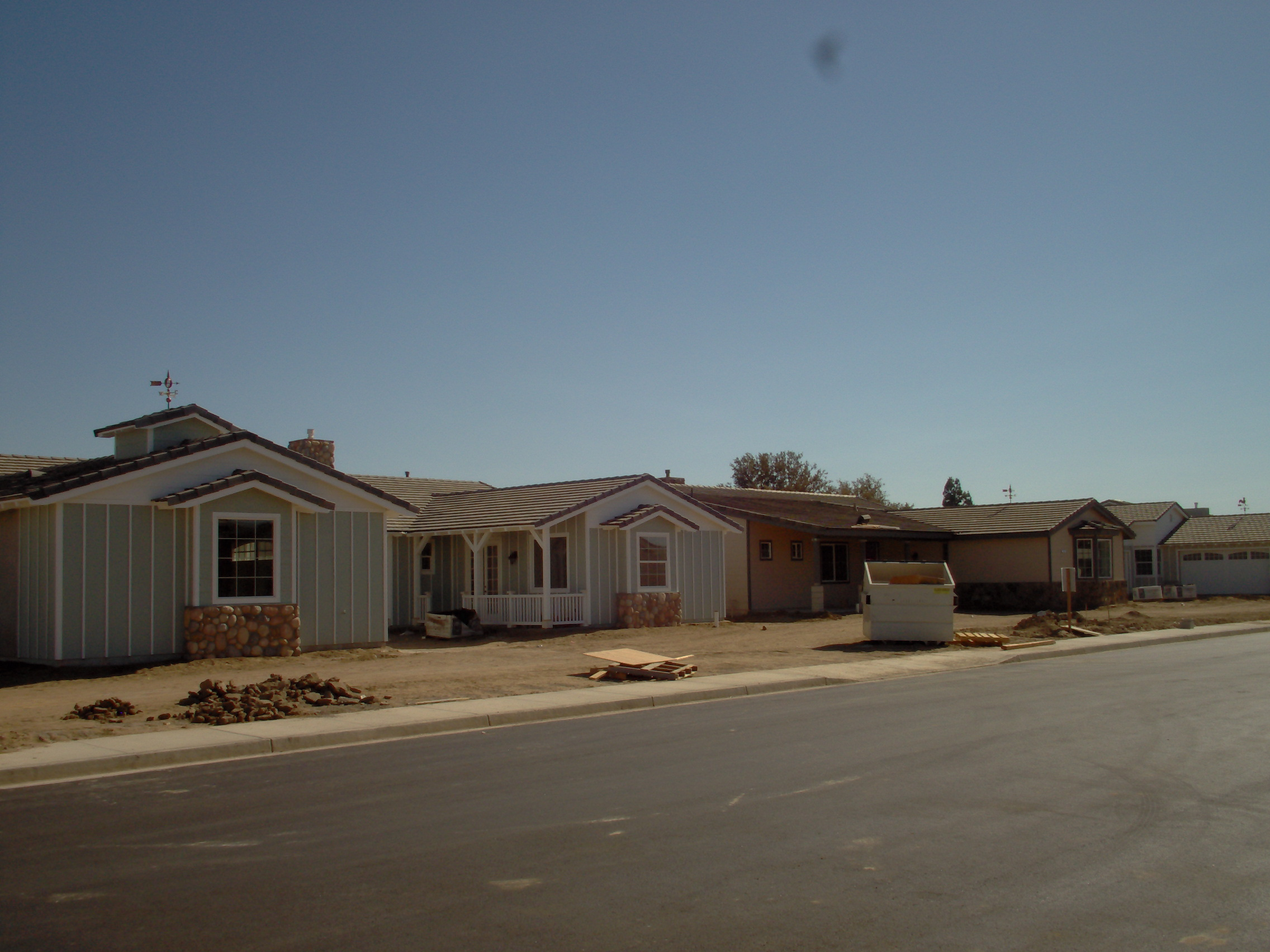
Houses under construction in Butte Court, Shafter, California

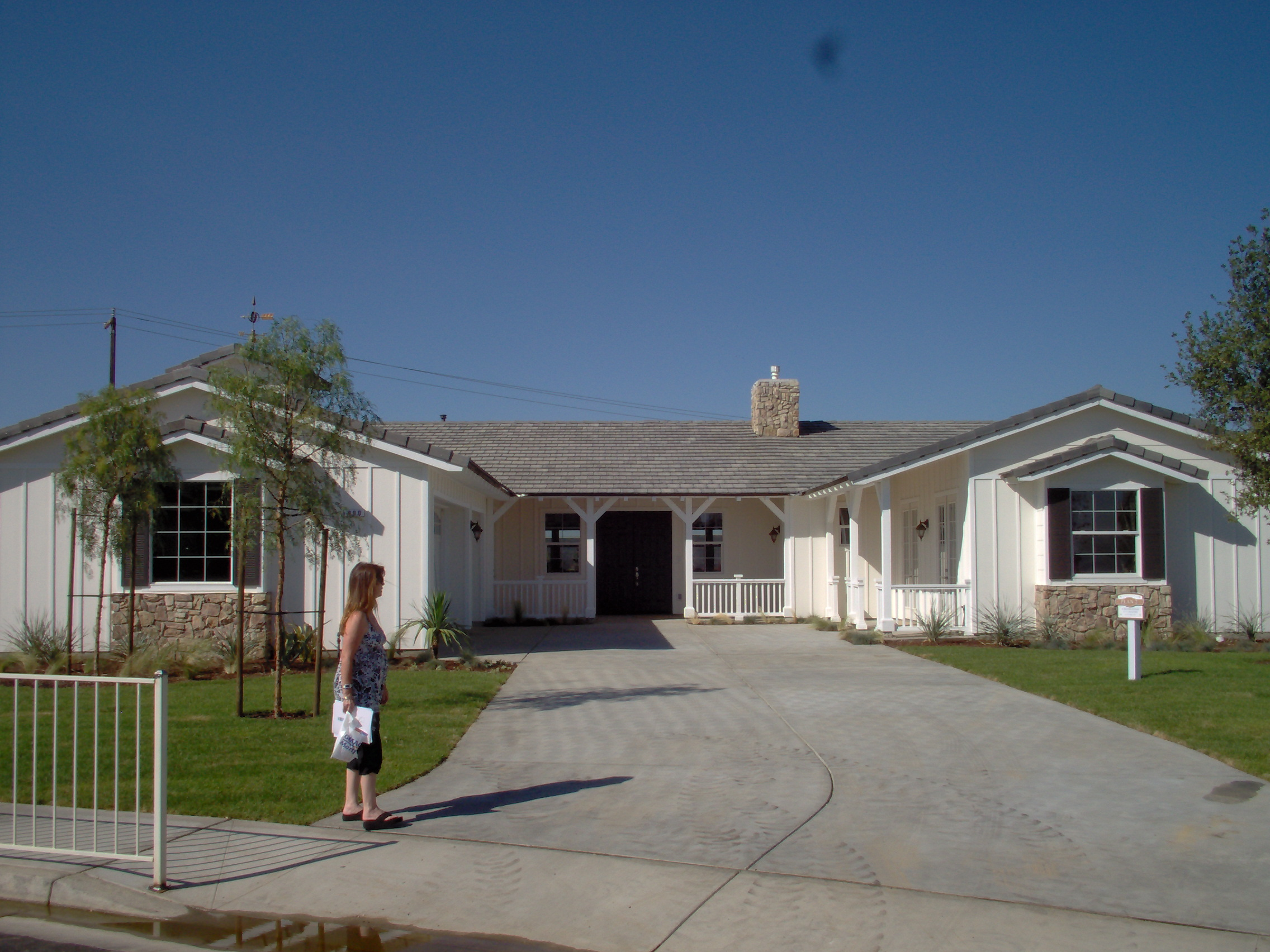
Ranch-style house in Shafter, California

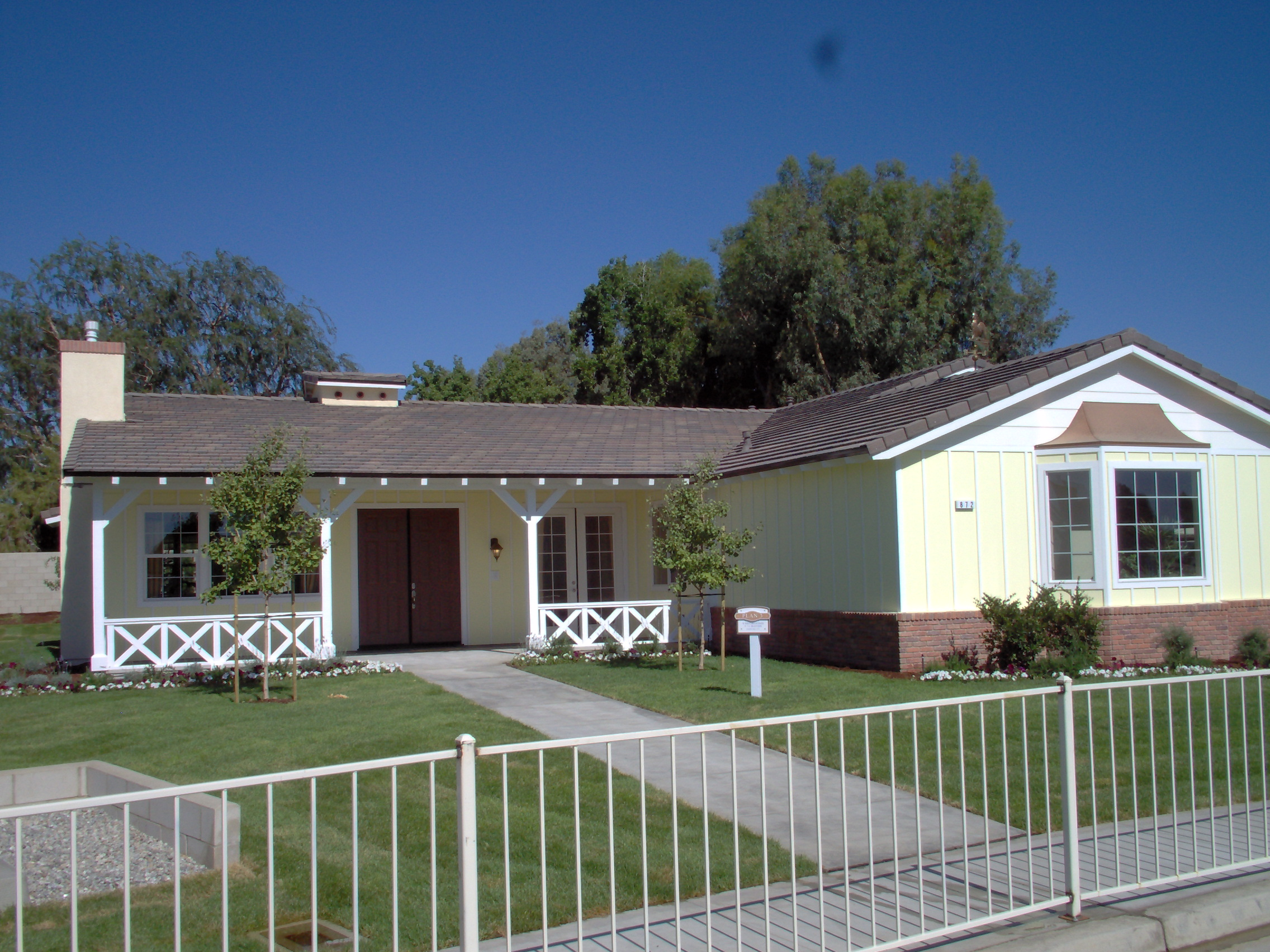
Ranch-style house in Shafter, California

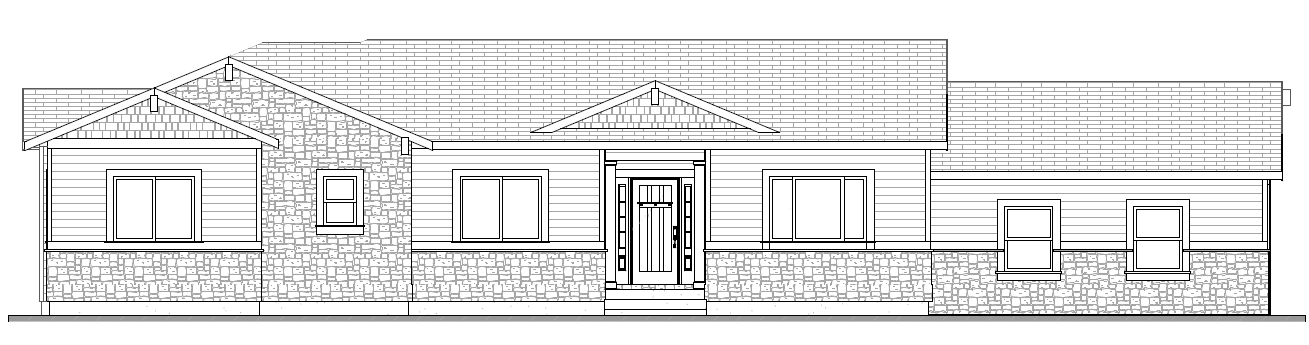
Modern revival Ranch-style house design featuring Neo-eclectic architecture elements in Denver, Colorado

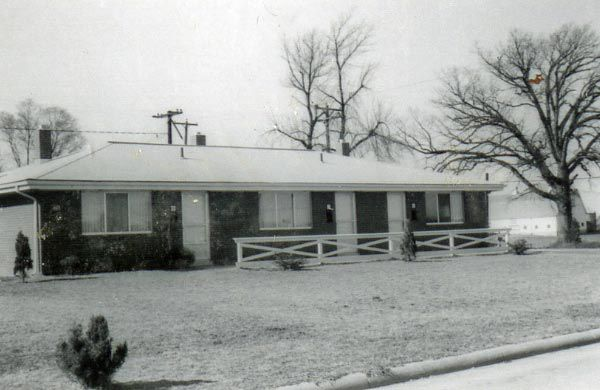
Traditional ranch-style house in Toledo, Ohio, in about 1965

== See also ==
- Splanch
- Edward H. Fickett
- American Craftsman
- Minimal Traditional
- Mission Revival Style architecture
- Mar del Plata style
