= Vernacular architecture =

Architecture based on local needs, materials, traditions

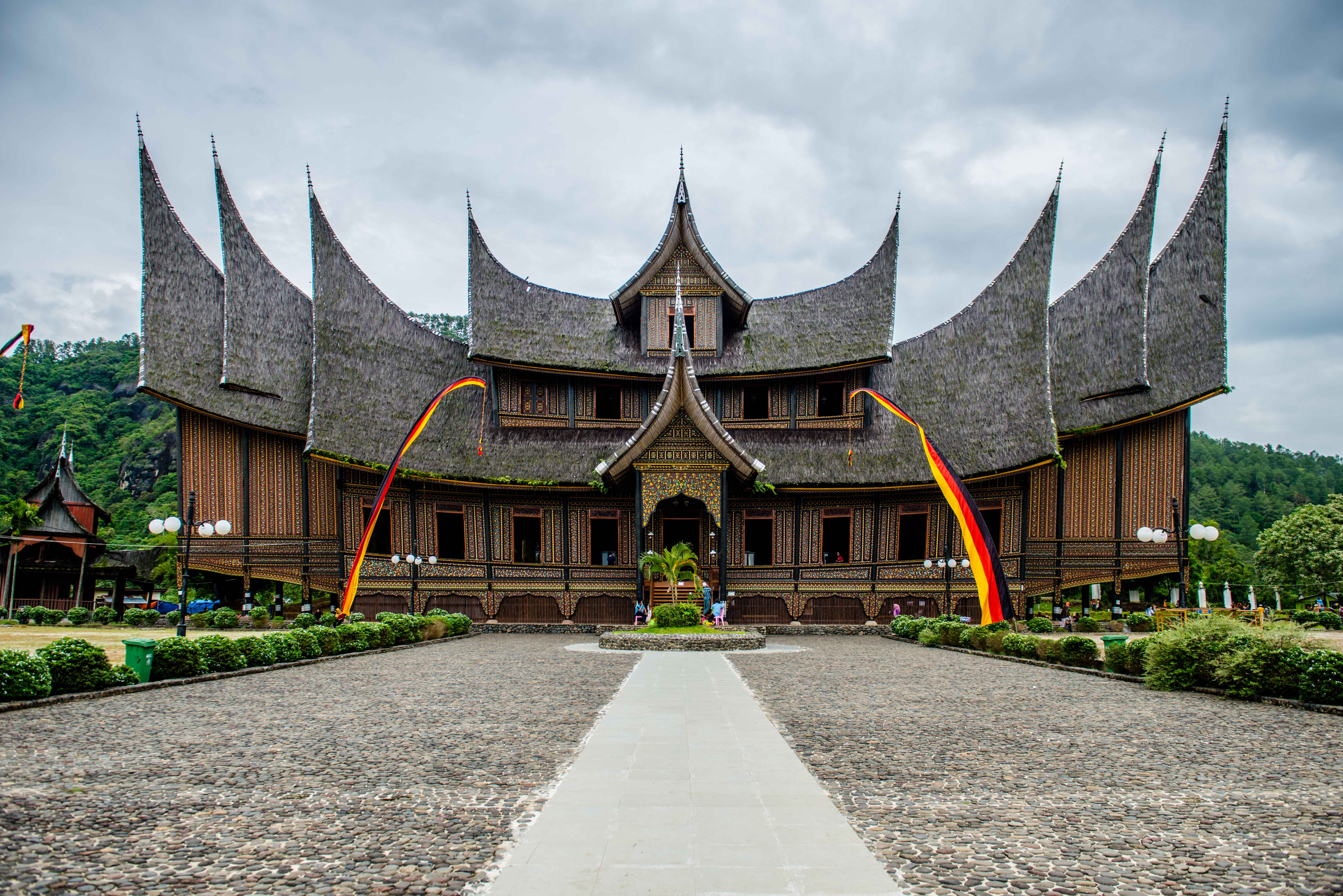
Minangkabau architecture from West Sumatra, Indonesia, inspired by the shape of a buffalo horn

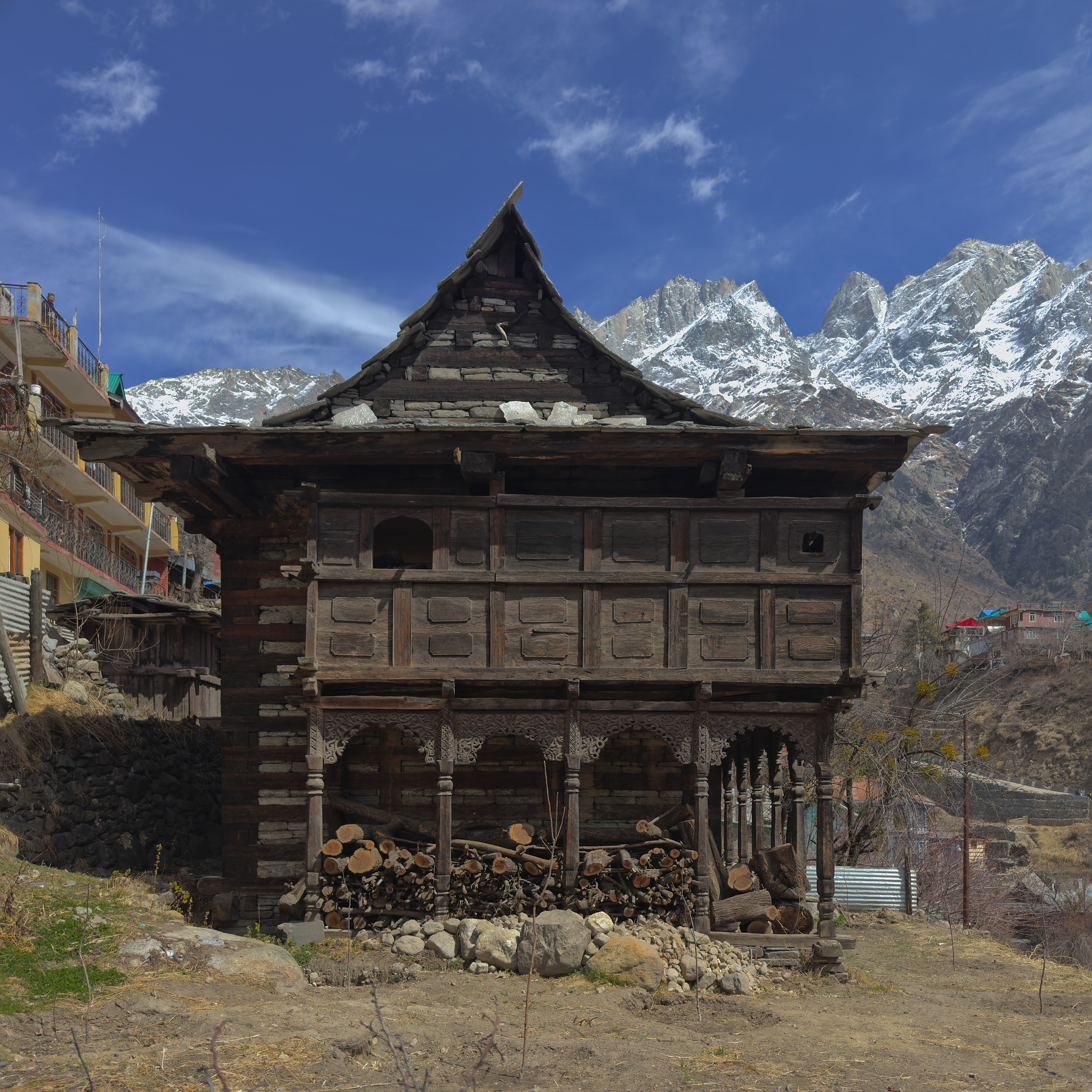
A traditional Kinnauri house, built in the Kath Kuni vernacular style, in the Himalayas of Himachal Pradesh, India

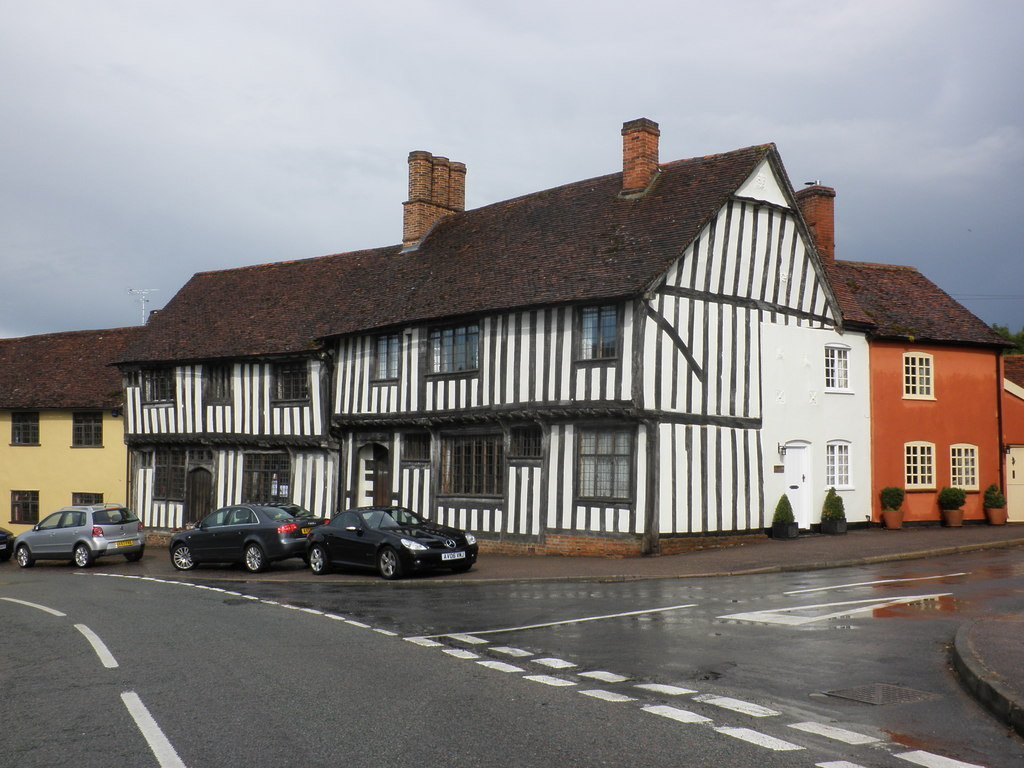
English vernacular building, 16th-century half-timbering and later buildings, in the village of Lavenham, Suffolk

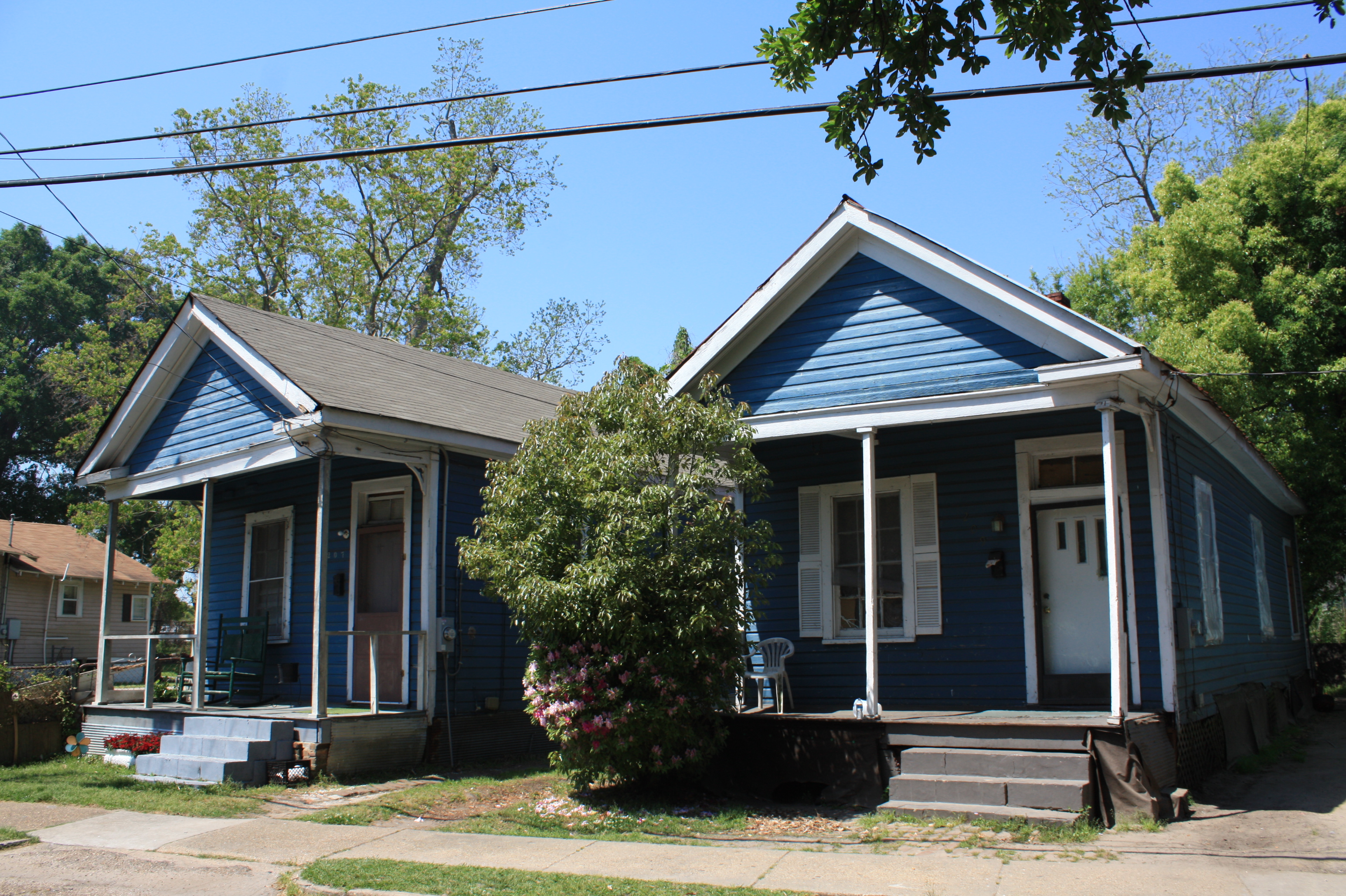
A pair of single 1920s shotgun houses in the Campground Historic District of Mobile, Alabama

Vernacular architecture (also folk architecture) is building done outside any academic tradition, and without the involvement of professional designers and architects. Vernacular architecture is not a particular architectural movement or style. Rather, it is a broad category, encompassing a wide range and variety of building types; with differing methods of construction from around the world, including historical and extant, classical and modern examples. In 1995, Amos Rapoport estimated that vernacular architecture constitutes 95% of the world's built environment, as measured against the small percentage of new buildings every year designed by architects and built by engineers. Vernacular architecture directly influences traditional architecture, a professional and academic practice deliberately and explicitly referencing and continuing local historical traditions and vernacular.

Vernacular architecture usually serves immediate, local needs, is constrained by the materials available in its particular region, and reflects local traditions and cultural practices. The study of vernacular architecture does not examine formally schooled architects, but instead the design skills and traditions of local builders, who were rarely given any attribution for their work. More recently, vernacular architecture has been examined by designers and the building industry in an effort to be more energy conscious with contemporary design and construction—part of a broader interest in sustainable design.

As of 1986, even among scholars publishing in the field, the exact boundaries of "vernacular" have not been clear.

This issue of definition, apparently so simple, has proven to be one of the most serious problems for advocates of vernacular architecture and landscapes research. A straightforward, convincing, authoritative definition has not yet been offered. Vernacular architecture is a phenomenon that many understand intuitively but that few are able to define. The literature on the subject is thus filled with what might be called non-definitions. Vernacular architecture is non-high style building, it is those structures not designed by professionals; it is not monumental; it is un-sophisticated; it is mere building; it is, according to the distinguished historian Nikolaus Pevsner, not architecture. Those who take a more positive approach rely on adjectives like ordinary, everyday, and commonplace. While these terms are not as pejorative as other descriptive phrases that are sometimes applied to the vernacular, neither are they very precise. For example, the skyscrapers of Manhattan are works of high style architecture, but they are also commonplace in Manhattan. Are they not logically New York City vernacular buildings?

Vernacular architecture tends to be overlooked in traditional histories of design. It is not a stylistic description, much less one specific style, so it cannot be summarized in terms of easy-to-understand patterns, characteristics, materials, or elements. Because of the usage of traditional building methods and local builders, vernacular buildings are considered cultural expressions—aboriginal, indigenous, ancestral, rural, ethnic, or regional—as much as architectural artifacts.

== Evolution of the phrase ==
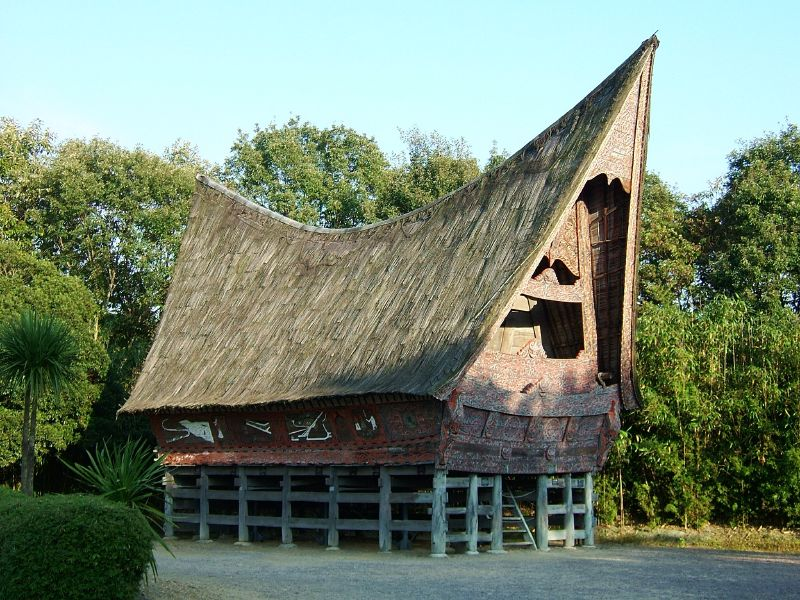
A traditional Batak house, Indonesia, in an ancient Austronesian architectural style

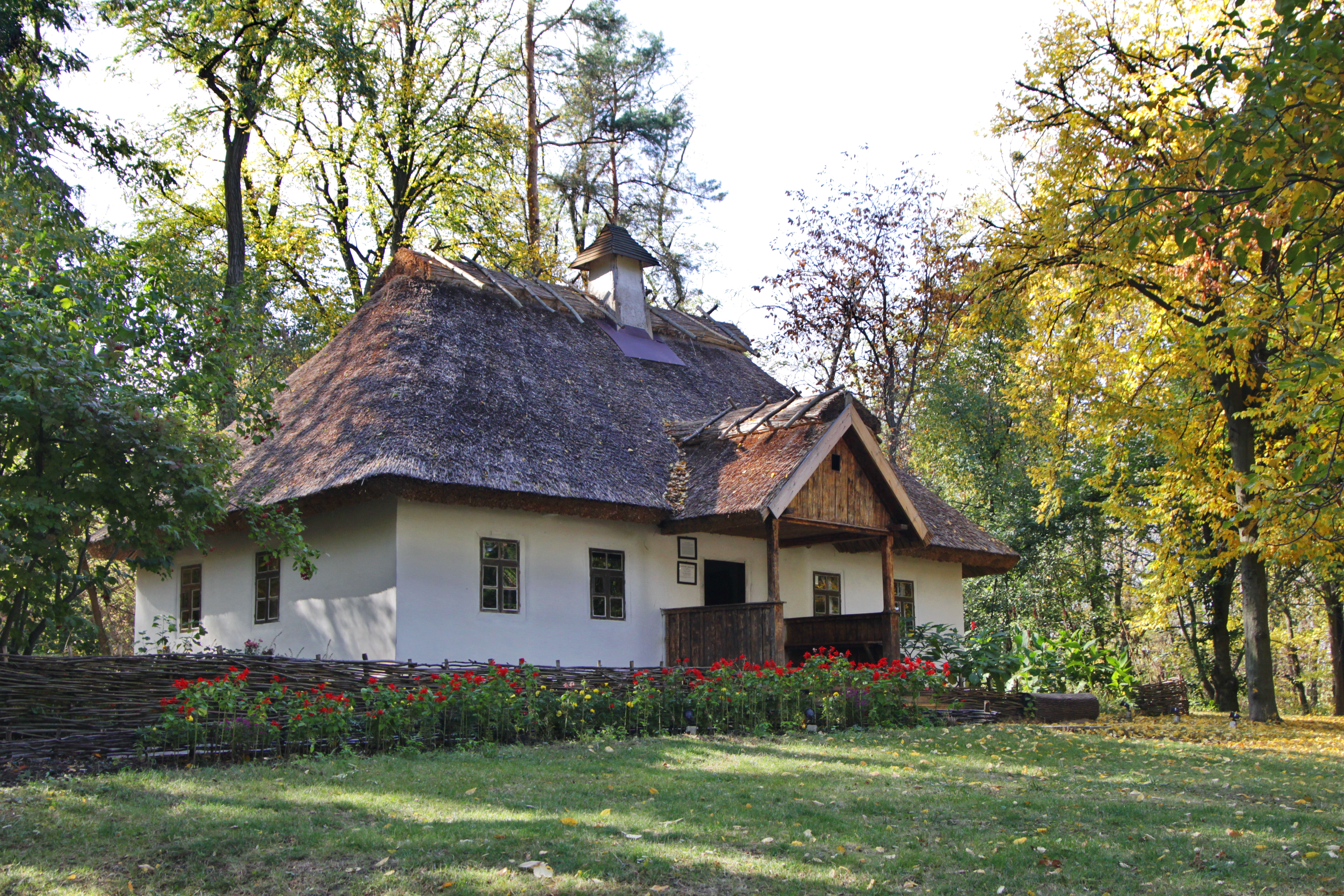
Ukrainian traditional house

The term vernacular means 'domestic, native, indigenous', from verna 'native slave' or 'home-born slave'. The word probably derives from an older Etruscan word.

The term is borrowed from linguistics, where vernacular refers to language use particular to a time, place, or group.

The phrase dates to at least 1857, when it was used by Sir George Gilbert Scott, as the focus of the first chapter of his book "Remarks on Secular & Domestic Architecture, Present & Future", and in a paper read to an architectural society in Leicester in October of that year. As a proponent of the Gothic Revival movement in England, Scott used the term as a pejorative to refer to the "prevailing architecture" in England of the time, all of it, as opposed to the Gothic he wanted to introduce. In this "vernacular" category Scott included St Paul's Cathedral, Greenwich Hospital, London, and Castle Howard, although admitting their relative nobility.

The term was popularized with positive connotations in a 1964 exhibition at the Museum of Modern Art, New York, designed by architect Bernard Rudofsky, with a subsequent book. Both were called Architecture Without Architects. Featuring dramatic black-and-white photography of vernacular buildings around the world, the exhibition was extremely popular. Rudofsky brought the concept into the eye of the public and of mainstream architecture, and also kept the definitions loose: he wrote that the exhibition "attempts to break down our narrow concepts of the art of building by introducing the unfamiliar world of nonpedigree architecture. It is so little known that we don't even have a name for it. For want of a generic label we shall call it vernacular, anonymous, spontaneous, indigenous, rural, as the case may be." The book was a reminder of the legitimacy and "hard-won knowledge" inherent in vernacular buildings, from Polish salt-caves to gigantic Syrian water wheels to Moroccan desert fortresses and was considered iconoclastic at the time.

The term "commercial vernacular" was popularized in the late 1960s by the publication of Learning from Las Vegas by Robert Venturi and Denise Scott Brown, referring to 20th-century American suburban tract and commercial architecture.

Although vernacular architecture might be designed by people who do have some training in design, in 1971 Ronald Brunskill nonetheless defined vernacular architecture as:

...a building designed by an amateur without any training in design; the individual will have been guided by a series of conventions built up in his locality, paying little attention to what may be fashionable. The function of the building would be the dominant factor, aesthetic considerations, though present to some small degree, being quite minimal. Local materials would be used as a matter of course, other materials being chosen and imported quite exceptionally.

In the Encyclopedia of Vernacular Architecture of the World edited in 1997 by Paul Oliver of the Oxford Institute for Sustainable Development, Oliver argued that vernacular architecture, given the insights it offers to issues of environmental adaptation, will be necessary in the future to "ensure sustainability in both cultural and economic terms beyond the short term." The encyclopedia defines the field of vernacular architecture as:

comprising the dwellings and all other buildings of the people. Related to their environmental contexts and available resources they are customarily owner- or community-built, utilizing traditional technologies. All forms of vernacular architecture are built to meet specific needs, accommodating the values, economies and ways of life of the cultures that produce them.

In 2007 Allen Noble wrote a lengthy discussion of the relevant terms, in Traditional Buildings: A Global Survey of Structural Forms and Cultural Functions. Noble concluded that "folk architecture" is built by "persons not professionally trained in building arts." "Vernacular architecture" is "of the common people", but may be built by trained professionals, using local, traditional designs and materials. "Traditional architecture" is architecture passed down from person to person, generation to generation, particularly orally, but at any level of society, not just by common people. Noble discourages the use of the term "primitive architecture". The term “popular architecture” is used more in Eastern Europe and is synonymous with folk or vernacular architecture.

== Vernacular and the architect ==
Architecture designed by professional architects is usually not considered to be vernacular. Indeed, it can be argued that the very process of consciously designing a building makes it not vernacular. Paul Oliver, in his book Dwellings, states: "it is contended that 'popular architecture' designed by professional architects or commercial builders for popular use, does not come within the compass of the vernacular". Oliver also offers the following simple definition of vernacular architecture: "the architecture of the people, and by the people, but not for the people."

Frank Lloyd Wright described vernacular architecture as "Folk building growing in response to actual needs, fitted into environment by people who knew no better than to fit them with native feeling". suggesting that it is a primitive form of design, lacking intelligent thought, but he also stated that it was "for us better worth study than all the highly self-conscious academic attempts at the beautiful throughout Europe".

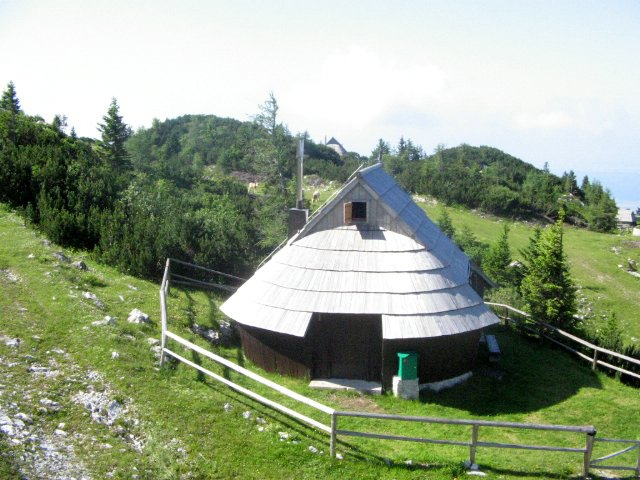
A post-World War II dwelling at the Big Pasture Plateau, Slovenia, designed by the architect Vlasto Kopač and based on the vernacular architecture of this mountainous area

Since at least the Arts and Crafts Movement, many modern architects have studied vernacular buildings and claimed to draw inspiration from them, including aspects of the vernacular in their designs. In 1946, the Egyptian architect Hassan Fathy was appointed to design the town of New Gourna near Luxor. Having studied traditional Nubian settlements and technologies, he incorporated the traditional mud brick vaults of the Nubian settlements in his designs. The experiment failed, due to a variety of social and economic reasons.

Sri Lankan architect Geoffrey Bawa is considered the pioneer of regional modernism in South Asia. Along with him, modern proponents of the use of the vernacular in architectural design include Charles Correa, a well known Indian architect; Muzharul Islam and Bashirul Haq, internationally known Bangladeshi architects; Balkrishna Doshi, another Indian, who established the Vastu-Shilpa Foundation in Ahmedabad to research the vernacular architecture of the region; and Sheila Sri Prakash who has used rural Indian architecture as an inspiration for innovations in environmental and socio-economically sustainable design and planning. The Dutch architect Aldo van Eyck was also a proponent of vernacular architecture, as were Samuel Mockbee, Christopher Alexander, and Paolo Soleri.

Oliver claims that:

As yet there is no clearly defined and specialized discipline for the study of dwellings or the larger compass of vernacular architecture. If such a discipline were to emerge it would probably be one that combines some of the elements of both architecture and anthropology with aspects of history and geography.

Architects have developed a renewed interest in vernacular architecture as a model for sustainable design.

== Influences on the vernacular ==
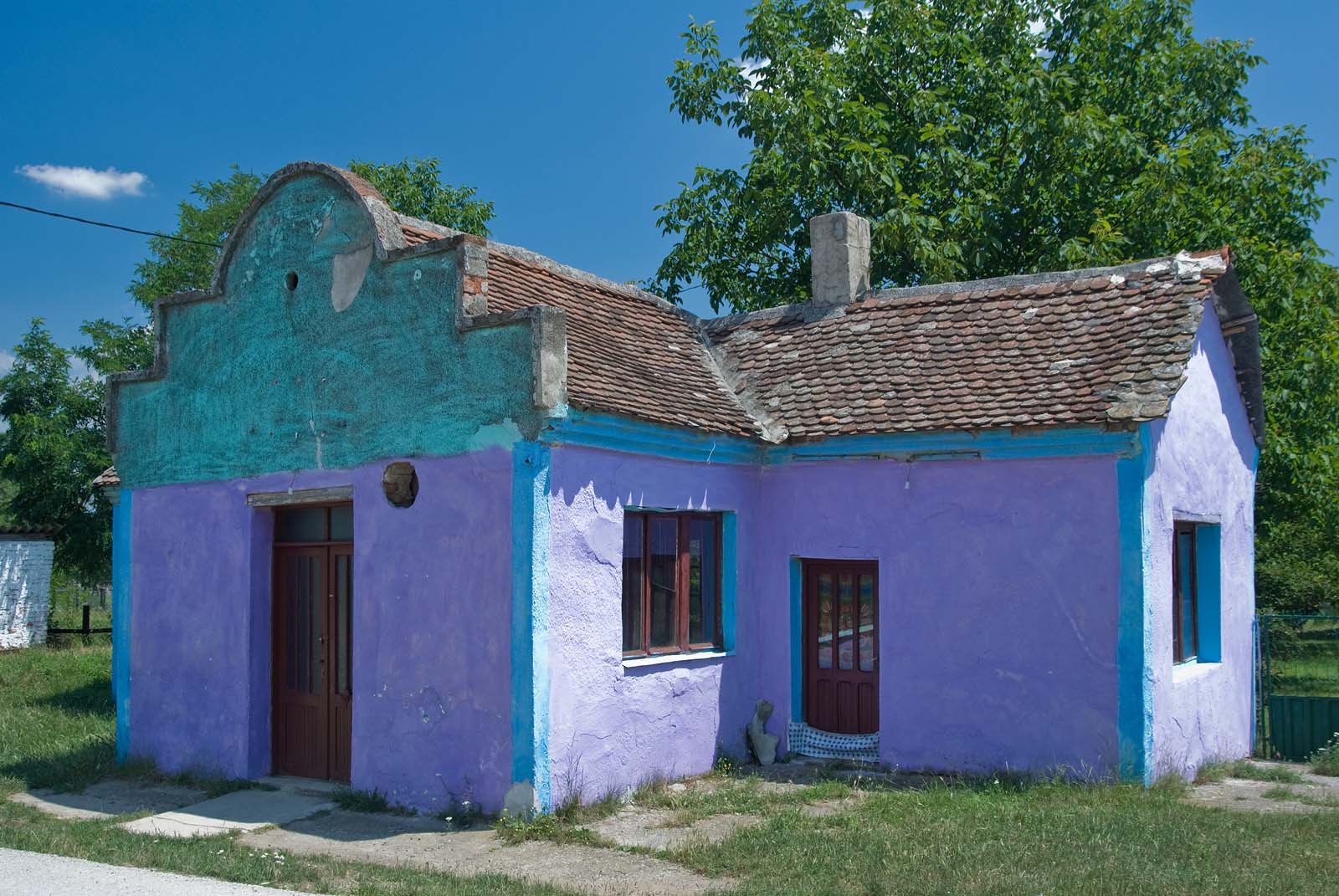
House in Brgule, Serbia

Vernacular architecture is influenced by a great range of different aspects of human behaviour and environment, leading to differing building forms for almost every different context; even neighbouring villages may have subtly different approaches to the construction and use of their dwellings, even if they at first appear the same. Despite these variations, every building is subject to the same laws of physics, and hence will demonstrate significant similarities in structural forms.

=== Climate ===
One of the most significant influences on vernacular architecture is the macro climate of the area in which the building is constructed. Buildings in cold climates invariably have high thermal mass or significant amounts of insulation. They are usually sealed in order to prevent heat loss, and openings such as windows tend to be small or even absent altogether. Buildings in warm climates, by contrast, tend to be constructed of lighter materials and to allow significant natural ventilation through openings in the fabric of the building.

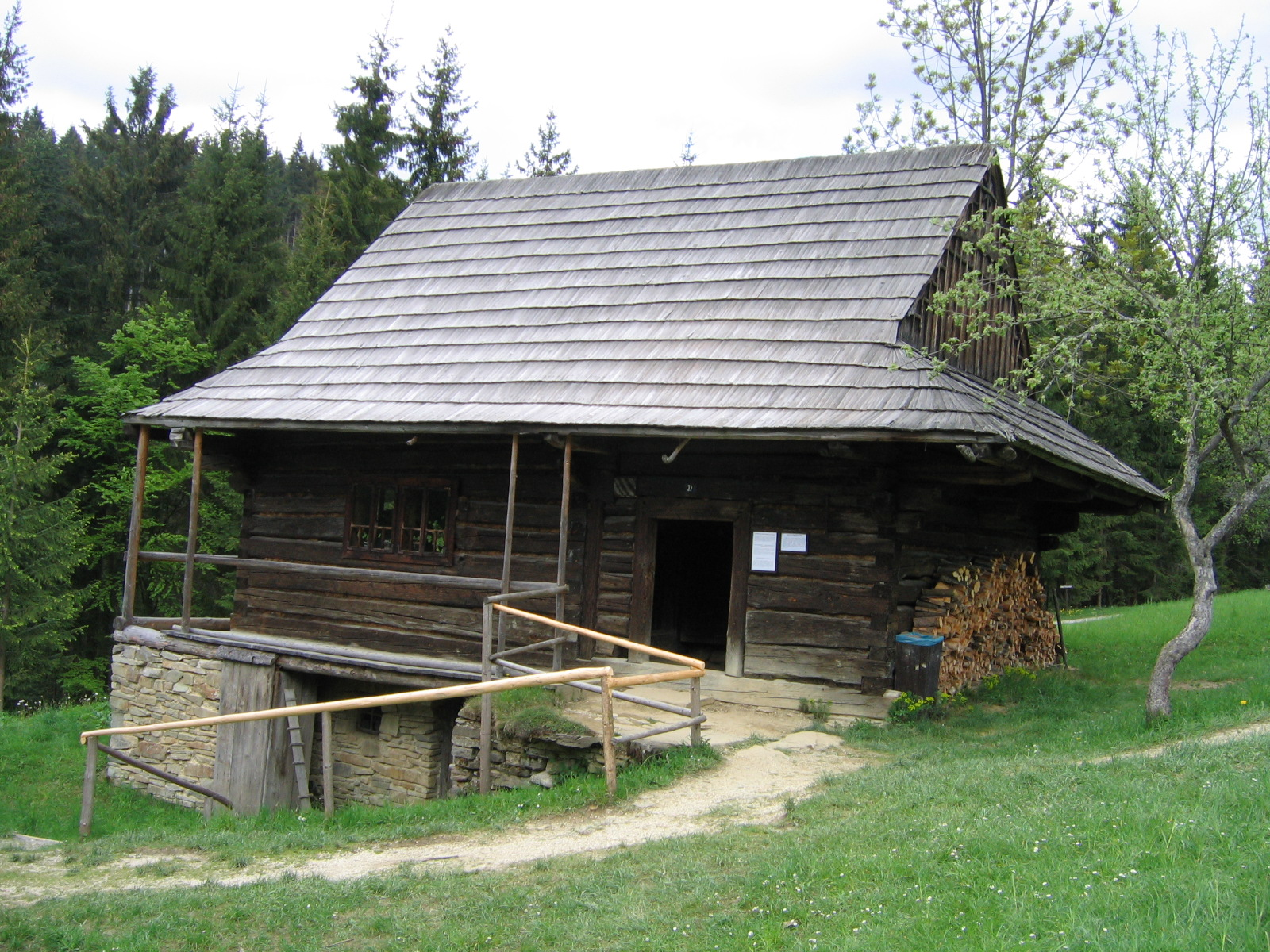
A log cabin in the region of Kysuce, Slovakia—an example of vernacular architecture in a relatively cold mountain climate using local wood

Buildings for a continental climate must be able to cope with significant variations in temperature and may even be altered by their occupants according to the seasons. In hot arid and semi-arid regions, vernacular structures typically include a number of distinctive elements to provide for ventilation and temperature control. Across the middle east, these elements included such design features as courtyard gardens with water features, screen walls, reflected light, mashrabiya (the distinctive oriel window with timber latticework) and bad girs (wind-catchers).

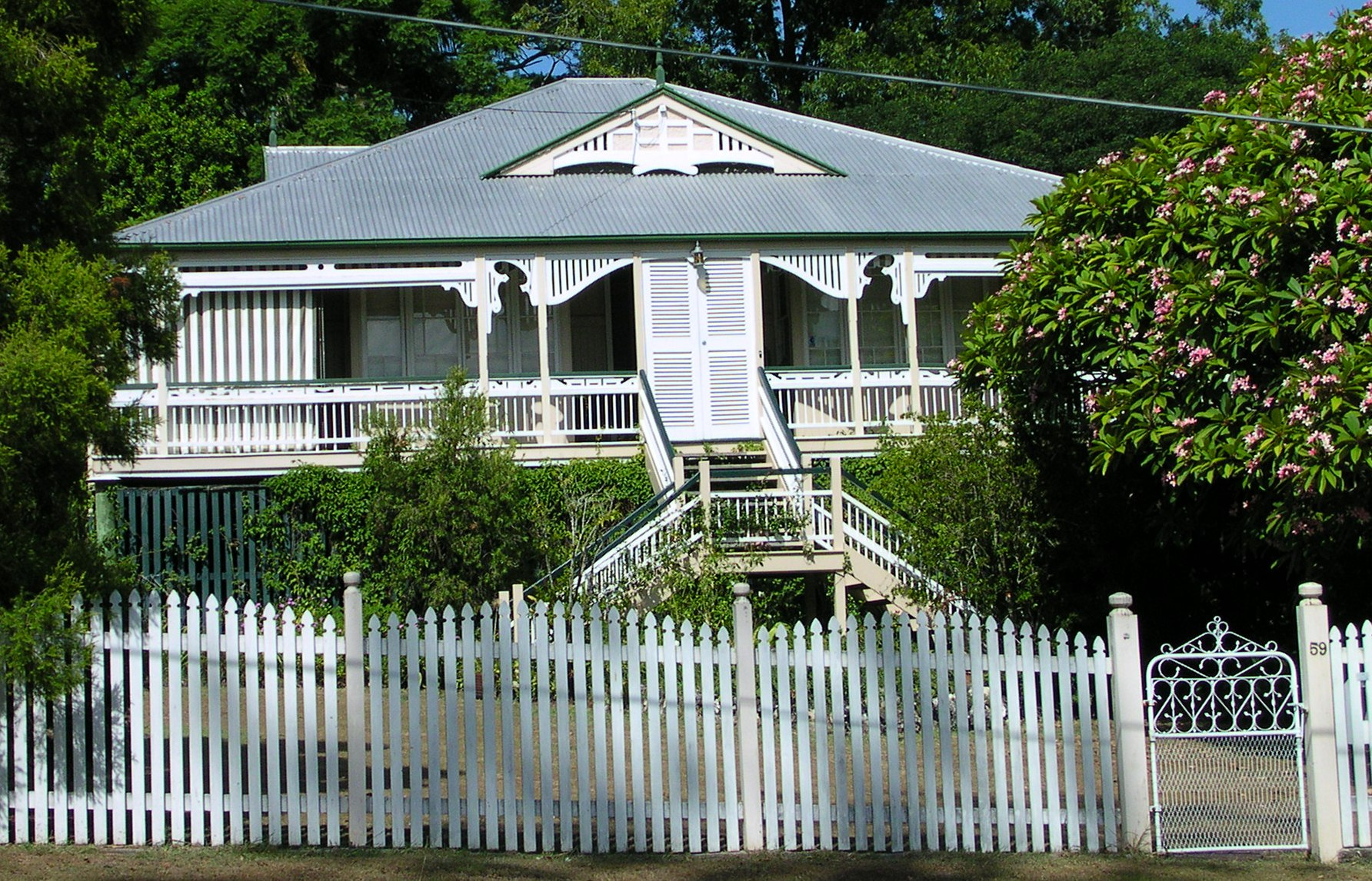
Queenslander, Australia

Buildings take different forms depending on precipitation levels in the region – leading to dwellings on stilts in many regions with frequent flooding or rainy monsoon seasons. For example, the Queenslander is an elevated weatherboard house with a sloped, tin roof that evolved in the early 19th-century as a solution to the annual flooding caused by monsoonal rain in Australia's northern states. Flat roofs are rare in areas with high levels of precipitation. Similarly, areas with high winds will lead to specialised buildings able to cope with them, and buildings tend to present minimal surface area to prevailing winds and are often situated low on the landscape to minimise potential storm damage.

Climatic influences on vernacular architecture are substantial and can be extremely complex. Mediterranean vernacular, and that of much of the Middle East, often includes a courtyard with a fountain or pond; air cooled by water mist and evaporation is drawn through the building by the natural ventilation set up by the building form. Similarly, Northern African vernacular often has very high thermal mass and small windows to keep the occupants cool, and in many cases also includes chimneys, not for fires but to draw air through the internal spaces. Such specializations are not designed but learned by trial and error over generations of building construction, often existing long before the scientific theories which explain why they work. Vernacular architecture is also used for the purposes of local citizens.

=== Culture ===
The way of life of building occupants, and the way they use their shelters, is of great influence on building forms. The size of family units, who shares which spaces, how food is prepared and eaten, how people interact, and many other cultural considerations will affect the layout and size of dwellings.

For example, the family units of several East African ethnic communities live in family compounds, surrounded by marked boundaries, in which separate single-roomed dwellings are built to house different members of the family. In polygamous communities there may be separate dwellings for different wives, and more again for sons who are too old to share space with the women of the family. Social interaction within the family is governed by, and privacy is provided by, the separation between the structures in which family members live. By contrast, in Western Europe, such separation is accomplished inside one dwelling, by dividing the building into separate rooms.

Culture also has a great influence on the appearance of vernacular buildings, as occupants often decorate buildings in accordance with local customs and beliefs.

==== Nomadic dwellings ====
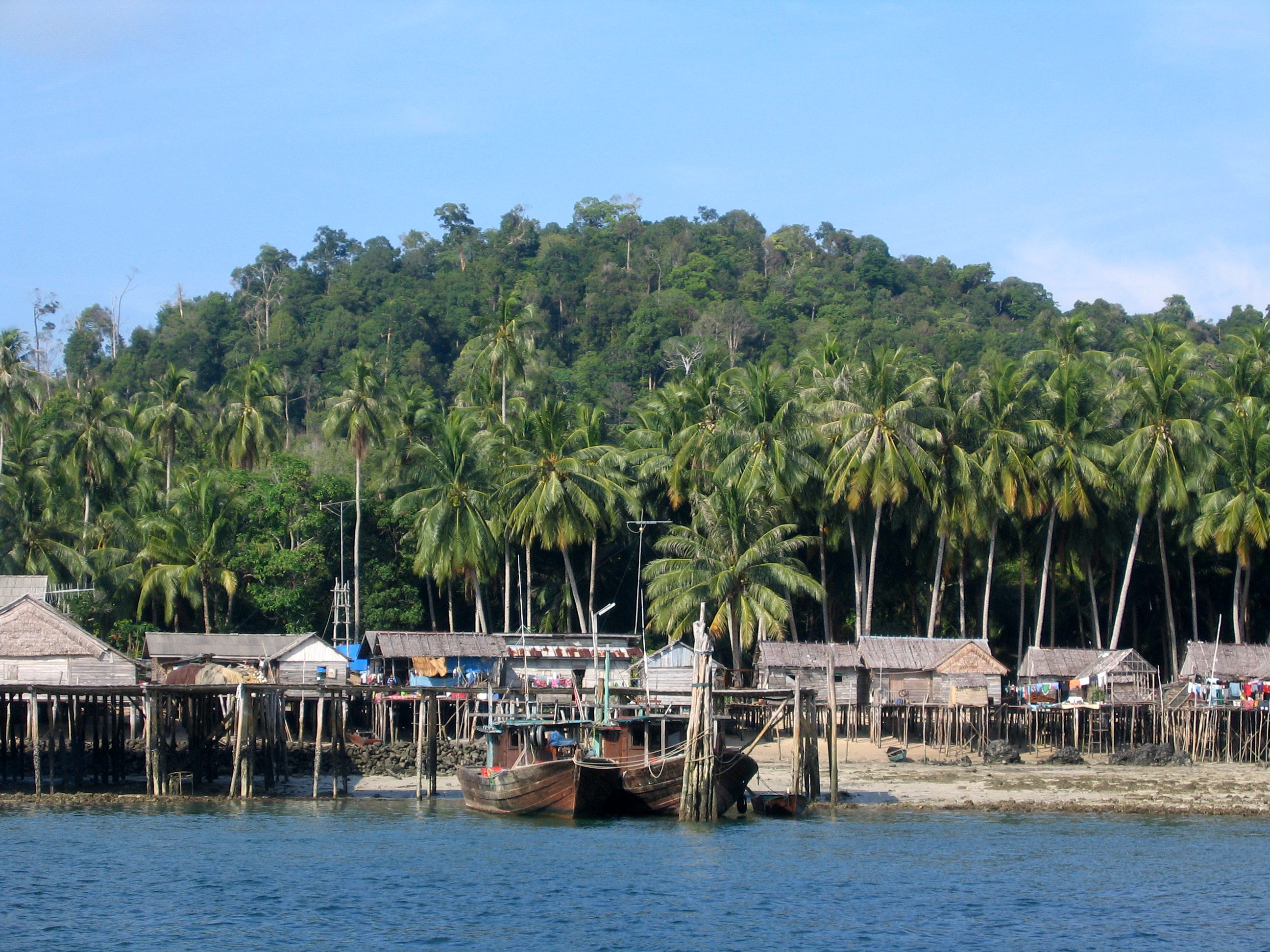
Stilt houses in Cempa, located in the Lingga Islands of Indonesia

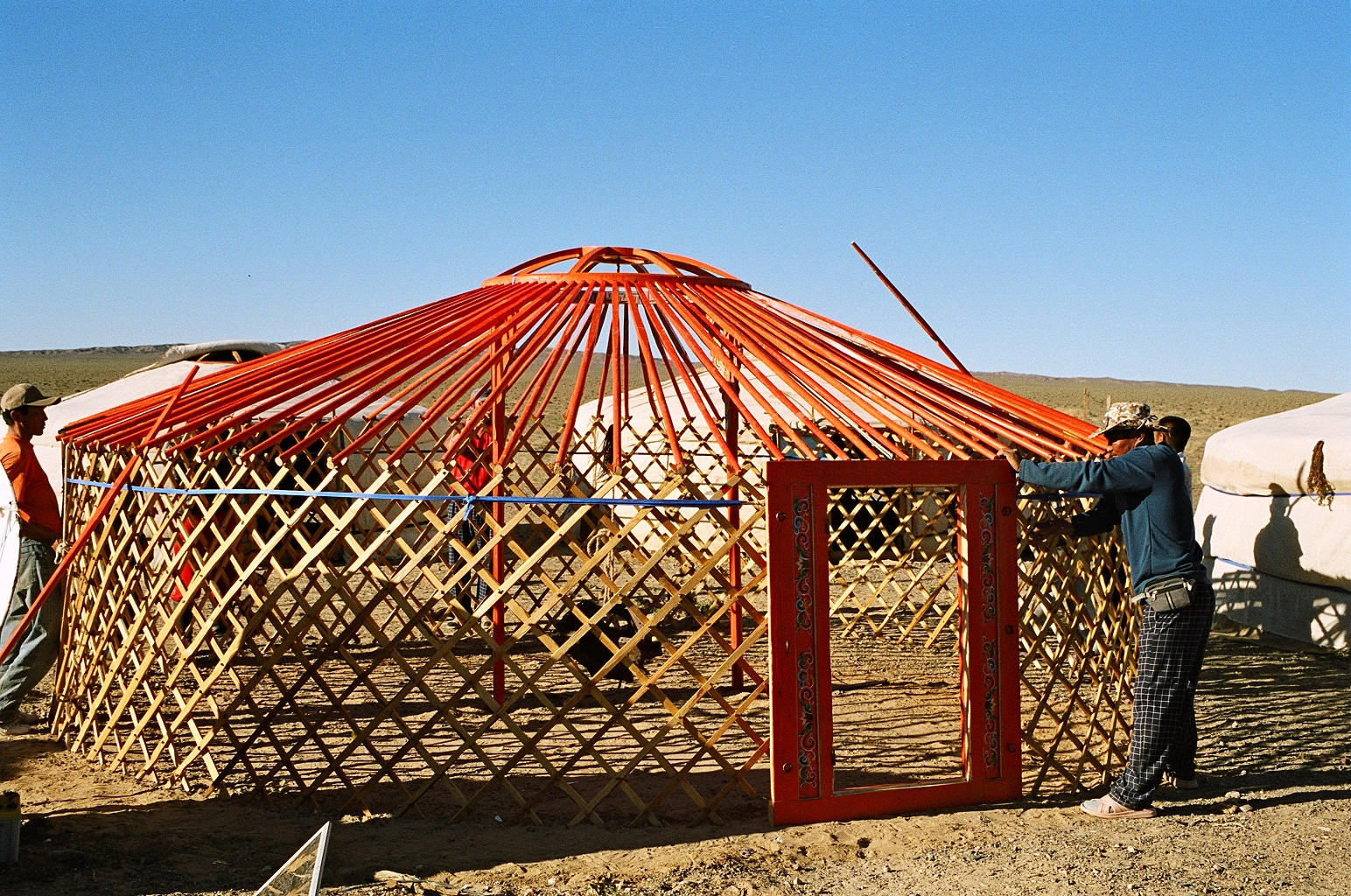
A Yurt or ger, a circular dwelling from Mongolia, during erection

There are many cultures around the world which include some aspect of nomadic life, and they have all developed vernacular solutions for the need for shelter. These all include appropriate responses to climate and customs of their inhabitants, including practicalities of simple construction such as huts, and if necessary, transport such as tents.

The Inuit have a number of different forms of shelter appropriate to different seasons and geographical locations, including the igloo (for winter) and the tupiq (for summer). The Sami of Northern Europe, who live in climates similar to those experienced by the Inuit, have developed different shelters appropriate to their culture including the lavvu and goahti. The development of different solutions in similar circumstances because of cultural influences is typical of vernacular architecture.

Many nomadic people use materials common in the local environment to construct temporary dwellings, such as the Punan of Sarawak who use palm fronds, or the Ituri Pygmies who use saplings and mongongo leaves to construct domed huts. Other cultures reuse materials, transporting them with them as they move. Examples of this are the tribes of Mongolia, who carry their gers (yurts) with them, or the black desert tents of the Qashgai in Iran. Notable in each case is the significant impact of the availability of materials and the availability of pack animals or other forms of transport on the ultimate form of the shelters.

All the shelters are adapted to suit the local climate. The Mongolian gers (yurts), for example, are versatile enough to be cool in hot continental summers and warm in the sub-zero temperatures of Mongolian winters and include a close-able ventilation hole at the centre and a chimney for a stove. A ger is typically not often relocated, and is therefore sturdy and secure, including wooden front door and several layers of coverings. A traditional Berber tent, by contrast, might be relocated daily, and is much lighter and quicker to erect and dismantle – and because of the climate it is used in, does not need to provide the same degree of protection from the elements.

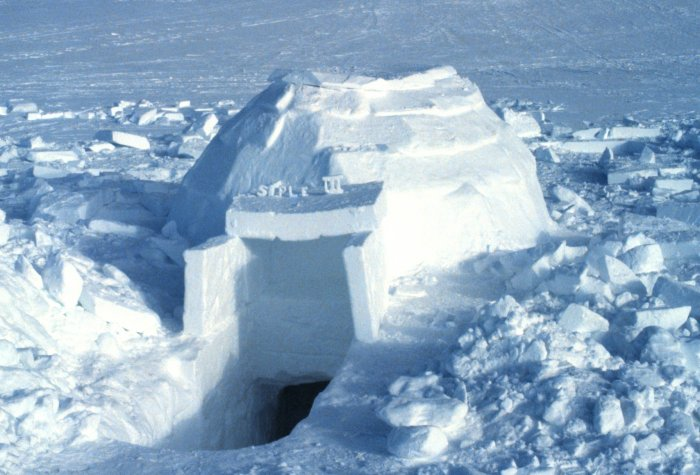
An unfinished igloo, an Inuit winter dwelling

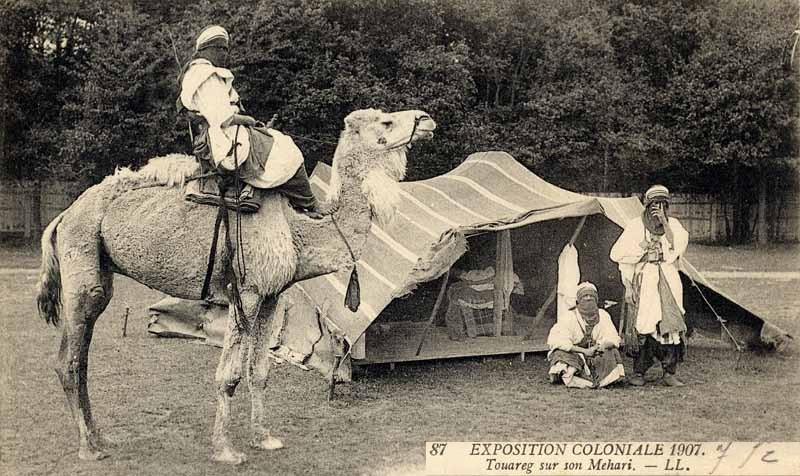
Tuareg tent during colonial exhibition in 1907

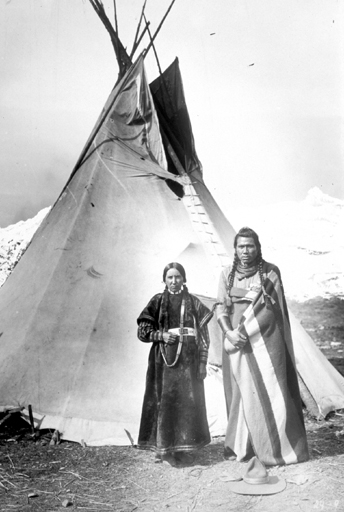
A tipi of the Nez Perce tribe, c. 1900

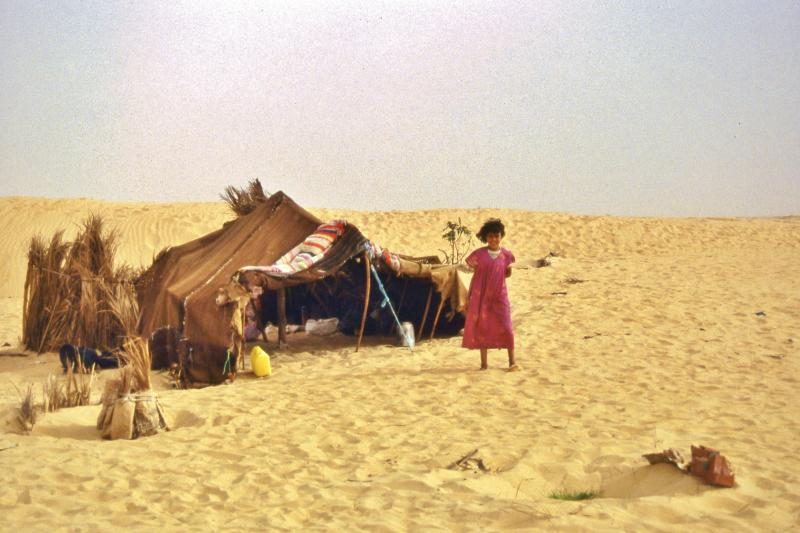
Arab Beduin tent from North Africa. Similar tents are also used by Arabs in the Middle East as well as by Persian and Tibetan nomads.

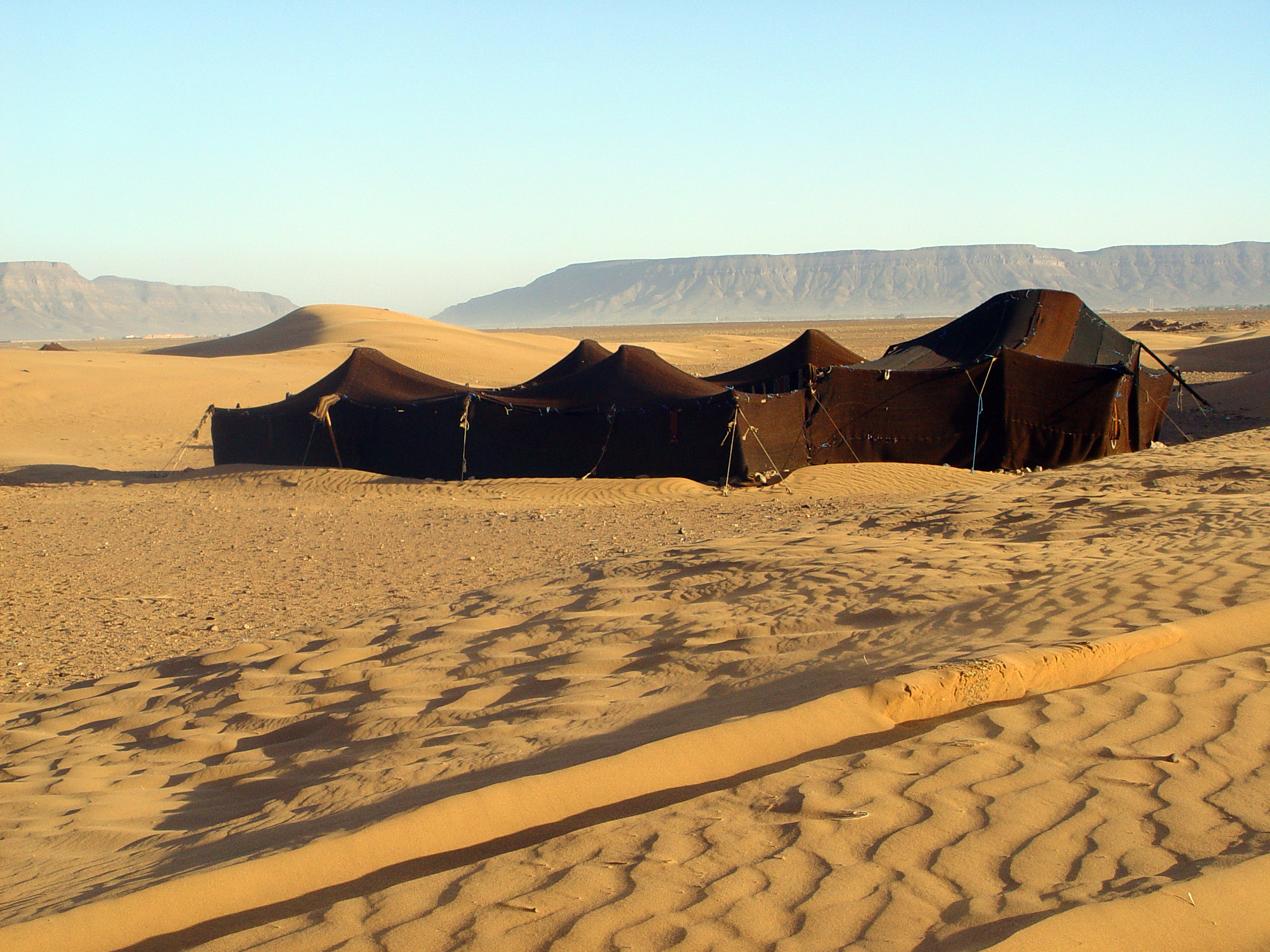
A Berber tent near Zagora, Morocco

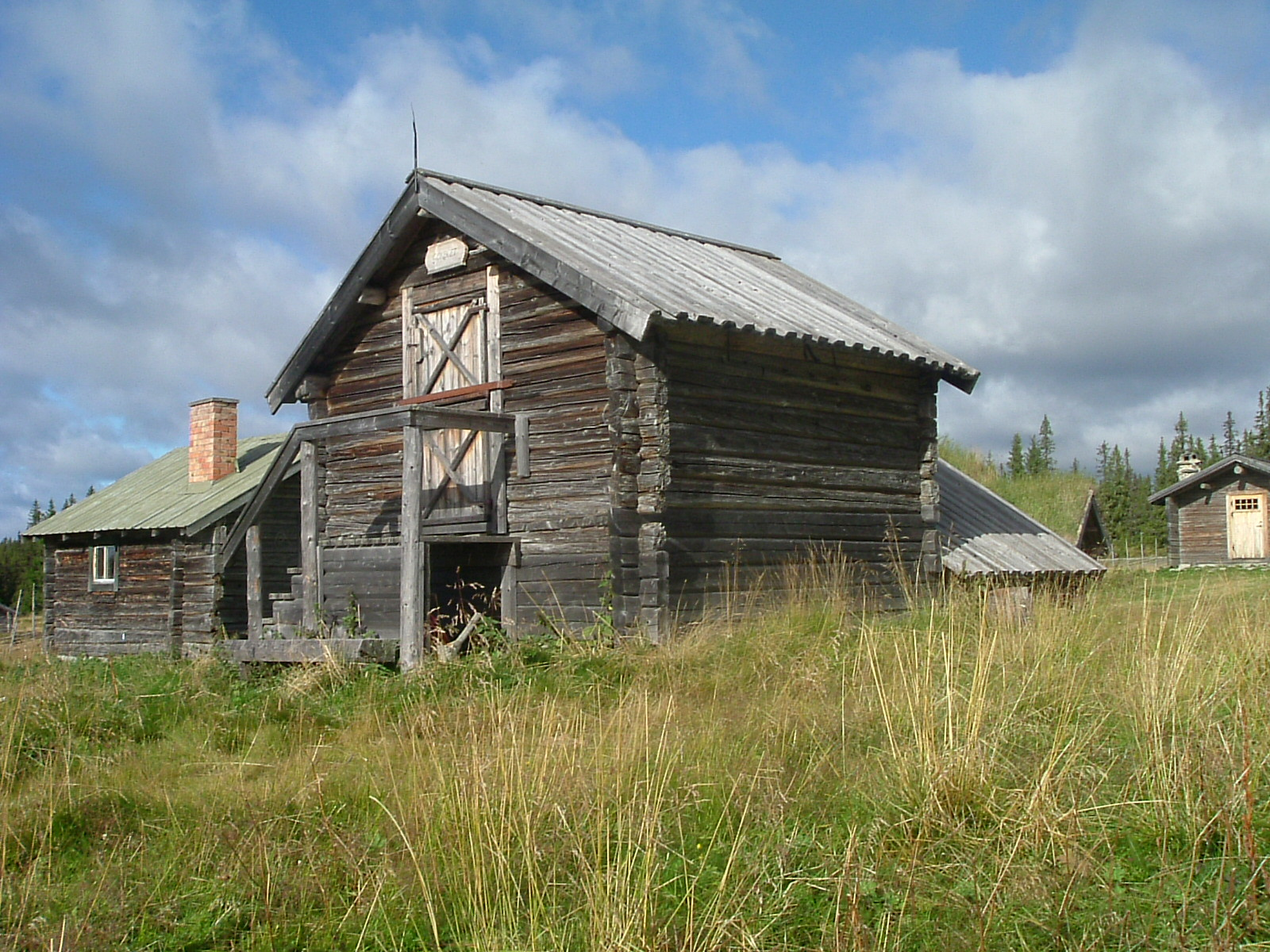
In transhumance (the seasonal movement of people with their livestock to pasture) the herders stay in huts or tents.

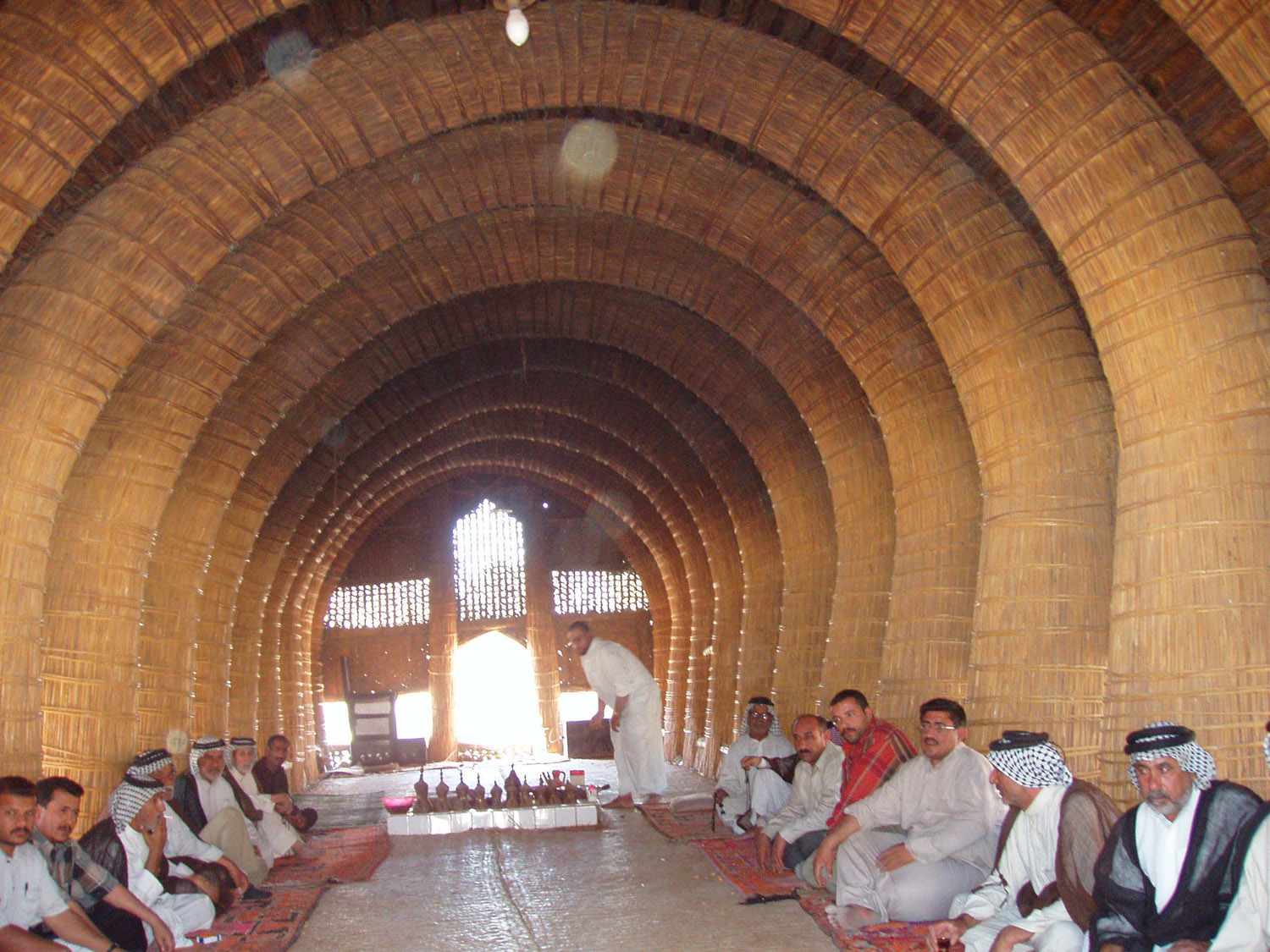
Interior of a mudhif; a reed dwelling used by Iraqi people of the marshlands

==== Permanent dwellings ====
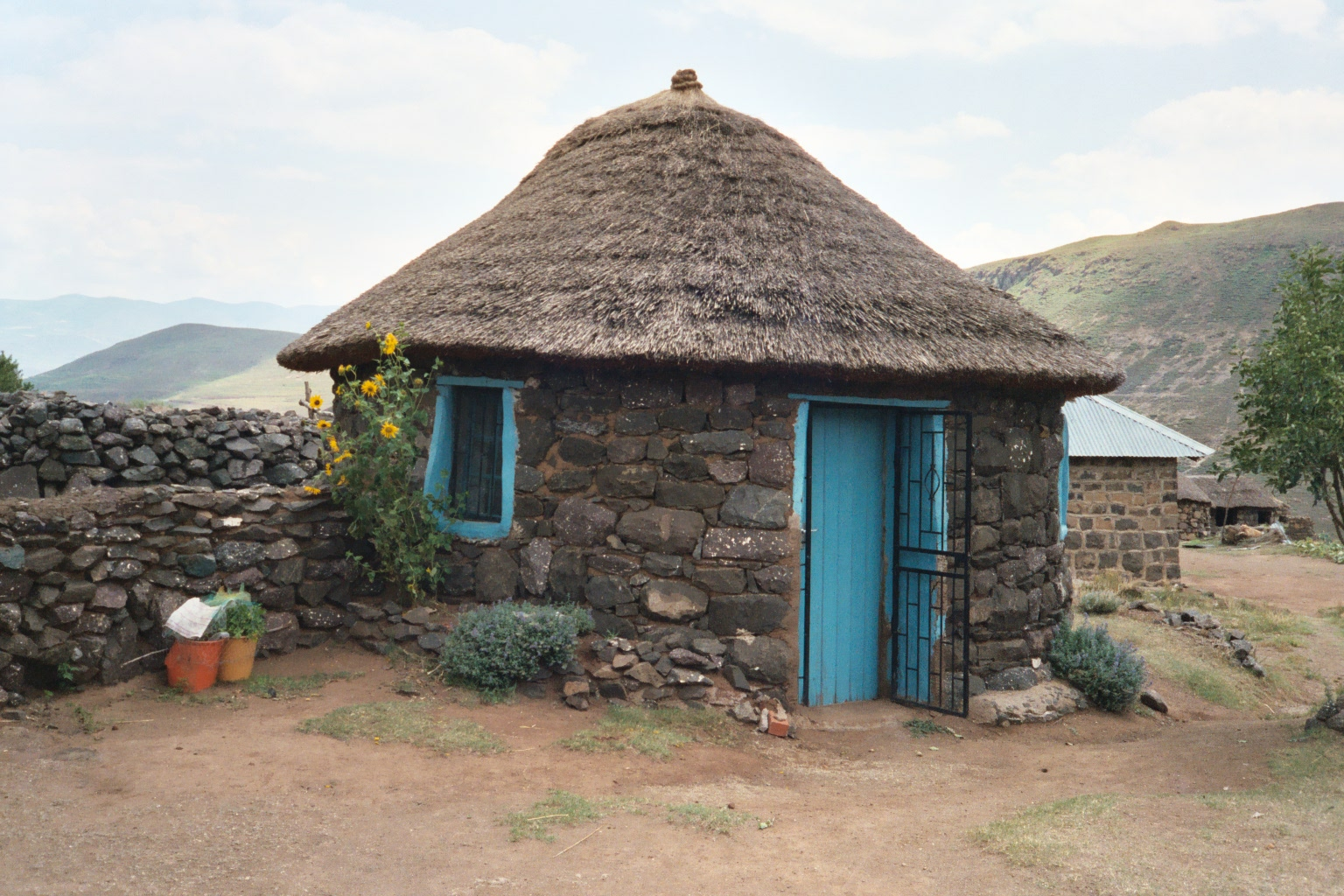
A Southern African rondavel (or banda)

The type of structure and materials used for a dwelling vary depending on how permanent it is. Frequently moved nomadic structures will be lightweight and simple, more permanent ones will be less so. When people settle somewhere permanently, the architecture of their dwellings will change to reflect that.

Materials used will become heavier, more solid and more durable. They may also become more complicated and more expensive, as the capital and labour required to construct them is a one-time cost. Permanent dwellings often offer a greater degree of protection and shelter from the elements. In some cases, however, where dwellings are subjected to severe weather conditions such as frequent flooding or high winds, buildings may be deliberately "designed" to fail and be replaced, rather than requiring the uneconomical or even impossible structures needed to withstand them. The collapse of a relatively flimsy, lightweight structure is also less likely to cause serious injury than a heavy structure.

Over time, dwellings' architecture may come to reflect a very specific geographical locale.

=== Environment, construction elements and materials ===
Vernacular architectural styles typically predate widespread access to means to transport large amounts of materials. Because of this, the local environment, the construction materials it can provide and the durability of these materials in the environment govern many aspects of vernacular architecture. Examples of structural material choices influenced by the environment include:

- Mud bricks are most common along river valleys in arid environments, where mud is available and rainfall is too low to damage unfired brick
- Fired bricks require access to clay and shale or brickearth, as well as fuel for kilns. Their colour is dictated by the mineral composition of the raw materials and the firing temperature
- Log houses require plentiful access to long, straight, softwood and are thus most common in taiga or temperate coniferous forest biomes
- Timber framing is associated with temperate broadleaf forests that provide hardwoods
- Bamboo construction is common in warm and moist tropical and warm temperate climates
- Dry stone huts are most common in mountain regions above the tree line and other rocky environments lacking trees
- Ashlar is more common is regions with access to workable stone such as sandstone, while hard stone materials favour rubble masonry

By contrast, petroleum products, such as bitumen, are uncommon, except in the vicinity of tar pits.

In early California redwood water towers supporting redwood tanks and enclosed by redwood siding (tankhouses) were part of a self-contained wind-powered domestic water system. Vernacular, almost by definition, is sustainable, and will not exhaust the local resources. If it is not sustainable, it is not suitable for its local context, and cannot be vernacular.

Construction elements and materials frequently found in vernacular buildings include:

- Adobe – a type of mud brick, often covered with white-wash, commonly used in Spain and Spanish colonies
- Cob – a type of plaster made from subsoil with the addition of fibrous material to give added strength
- Mashrabiya (also known as shanashol in Iraq) – a type of oriel window with timber lattice-work, designed to allow ventilation, commonly found in Iraq and Egypt in upper-class homes
- Rammed earth often used in foundations
- Saddleback roof
- Thatch – dry vegetation used as roofing material
- Windcatcher – a type of chimney used to provide natural ventilation without the use of air conditioning, commonly found in Iran, Iraq and other parts of the Middle-East
- Wychert – a blend of white earth and clay

== Legal aspects ==
As many jurisdictions introduce tougher building codes and zoning regulations, "folk architects" sometimes find themselves in conflict with the local authorities.

A case that made news in Russia was that of an Arkhangelsk entrepreneur Nikolay P. Sutyagin, who built what was reportedly the world's tallest single-family wooden house for himself and his family, only to see it condemned as a fire hazard. The 13-storey, 44 m (144 ft) tall structure, known locally as "Sutyagin's skyscraper" (Небоскрёб Сутягина), was found to be in violation of Arkhangelsk building codes, and in 2008 the courts ordered the building to be demolished by 1 February 2009. On 26 December 2008, the tower was pulled down, and the remainder was dismantled manually over the course of the next several months.

== Types and examples by region ==
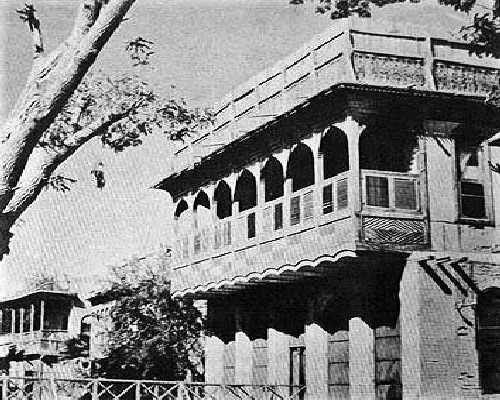
Mashrabiya (or shanashol window) in the old city of Basra, 1954

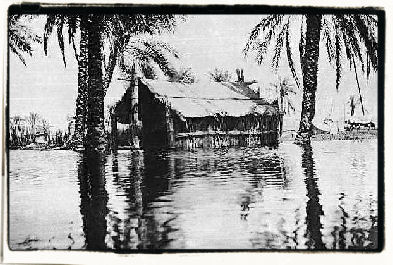
Mudhif, photo by Gertrude Bell 1918 or 1920

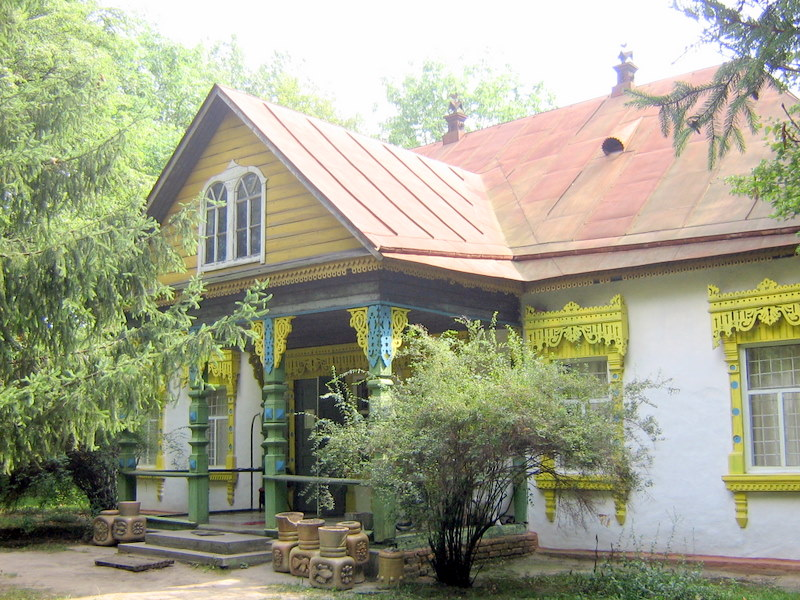
Museum of Decorative Finishes in Pereiaslav

=== Inter-regional ===
- Bender tent – a temporary dwelling used by Nomadic people
- Stilt house – a raised house found in monsoonal regions, especially monsoonal South Asia or other areas prone to flooding

=== Brazil ===
- Bustee – a dwelling made from waste materials, often associated with the slums of India or the favellas of Brazil

=== Canada ===
- Canadian Railway style – Railway stations built in Canada in the 19th and early 20th centuries were often simple wood structures that lacked decorative features. Some of these stations survive today but not as active railway stations.

=== England ===
- Bank barn, a type of combination barn found in Cumbria and Devon
- Bastle house, a fortified farmhouse on the Scottish border
- Burgaroosh, a poor-quality composite building material used around Brighton
- Cob and wychert, earth-based materials used in Devon and Buckinghamshire respectively
- Cruck, a curved timber used in pairs to form structures in western England in the Middle Ages
- Pargeting, a form of decorative external plaster seen in East Anglia
- Wealden house, a type of timber-framed hall house found in south-east England

=== Germany ===
- Gulf house
- Low German house
- Middle German house
- Old Frisian farmhouse

=== Iraq ===
- Desert castles – (in Arabic, known as q'sar) fortified palaces or castles built during the Umayyad period, the ruins of which are now scattered across the semi-arid regions of north-eastern Jordan, Syria, Israel, Palestine and Iraq. These often served as hunting lodges for noble families.
- Mudhif – a traditional building constructed entirely of reeds and common to the Marsh Arabs of southern Iraq.

=== Israel ===
- Sukkah – a temporary dwelling for use during the Jewish holiday of Sukkot. A sukkah must be made of organic materials, have three walls, and must have a roof that is partially open to the sky. The roof is typically made of branches or thatch.
- Four room house – Iron Age structures constructed of mud and stone.
- Wild Bau cladding style – the practice of repurposing rubble from Israeli structures destroyed during wars and terrorist attacks in masonry, especially in Katamon.

=== Italy ===
- Alpine 'barn' houses – dwellings built on the storey above the ground floor, which housed cattle during winter
- Dammuso (Dammusu) – dry stone housing of Pantelleria
- Sassi di Matera – cave dwellings
- Trullo – dry stone hut-shaped house with a conical roof

=== Philippines ===
- Torogan sleeping house in Mindanao, Philippines

=== Russia ===
==== Historic ====
Most historic Russian vernacular architecture is wooden. Russian estates and homesteads varied in size and complexity, ranging from small singular structures to large interconnected complexes with separate utility buildings. The main components of a traditional Russian dwelling are:

- Klet’ – an unheated log cabin, used for storage or as a summer house, sometimes connected to the rest of the homestead by seni.
- Izba – a heated residential klet’. The word “izba” can refer to either a standalone building, or a chamber within a larger homestead complex. The main feature of an izba is a Russian stove, a multipurpose masonry stove. A solitary four-wall izba with seni represented the simplest and most common type of Russian dwelling.
- Seni – a covered entryway or a passageway connecting different buildings. It was used as an airlock room to aid in heat retention and provided additional storage space.

==== Contemporary ====
- Dacha – a seasonal or year-round second home, often located in the exurbs of post-Soviet countries, including Russia. Typically self-built by homeowners, dachas can vary widely in layout and style, and can serve as an example of contemporary vernacular architecture.

=== Scotland ===
- Bastle house – a multi-storey, fortified farmhouse with sophisticated security measures designed to provide defence against the frequent raiding parties along the Scottish border.
- Blackhouse – a traditional dry-stone wall building, roofed with thatch of turf, a flagstone floor and central hearth, designed to accommodate livestock and people, separated by a partition.
- Crofters' cottage – a simple construction of stone walls filled with earth for insulation, a thatched or turf roof and stone slabs were set into the middle of the room for a peat fire which provided some form of central heating. An unusual croft house Brotchie's Steading, Dunnet was built with whale bone couples.
- Cruck house – a medieval structure designed to cope with shortages of long-span timber. The frame of the structure uses "siles" or "couples" (a type of fork) for the end walls. The walls do not support the roof, which is instead carried on the cruck frame. This type of building is common throughout England, Scotland and Wales, although only a few intact examples have survived.
- Shieling – a type of temporary hut (or a collection of huts) constructed of stone, sod and turf used as a dwelling during the summer months when highlanders took their livestock to higher ground in search of new pasture.
- Tower house or peel tower – a medieval building, typically of stone, constructed by the aristocratic classes as a defensible residence.
- Turf house – e.g. East Ayrshire, Medieval turf house

=== Spain ===
- Adobe house – mudbrick buildings found in Spain and Spanish colonies

=== United States ===
- Creole architecture in the United States – a type of house or cottage common along the Gulf Coast and associated rivers, especially in southern Louisiana and Mississippi.
- Earth lodge – a subterranean dwelling used by the Native Americans of the Great Plains
- Hogan – traditional dwelling of Navajo people
- Earl A. Young (born 31 March 1889 – 24 May 1975) was an American architect, realtor and insurance agent. Over a span of 52 years, he designed and built 31 structures in Charlevoix, Michigan but was never a registered architect. He worked mostly in stone, using limestone, fieldstone, and boulders he found throughout Northern Michigan. The homes are commonly referred to as gnome homes, mushroom houses, or Hobbit houses. His door, window, roof and fireplace designs were very distinct because of his use of curved lines. Young's goal was to show that a small stone house could be as impressive as a castle. Young also helped make Charlevoix the busy, summer resort town that it is today.

=== Ukraine ===
Different regions in Ukraine have their own examples of vernacular architecture. For example, in the Carpathian Mountains and the surrounding foothills, wood and clay are the primary traditional building materials. Ukrainian architecture is preserved at the Museum of Folk Architecture and Way of Life of Central Ukraine located in Pereiaslav, Ukraine.

=== Wales ===
- Longhouse (tŷ hir), a combined dwelling for people and animals

== Gallery ==
=== Africa ===
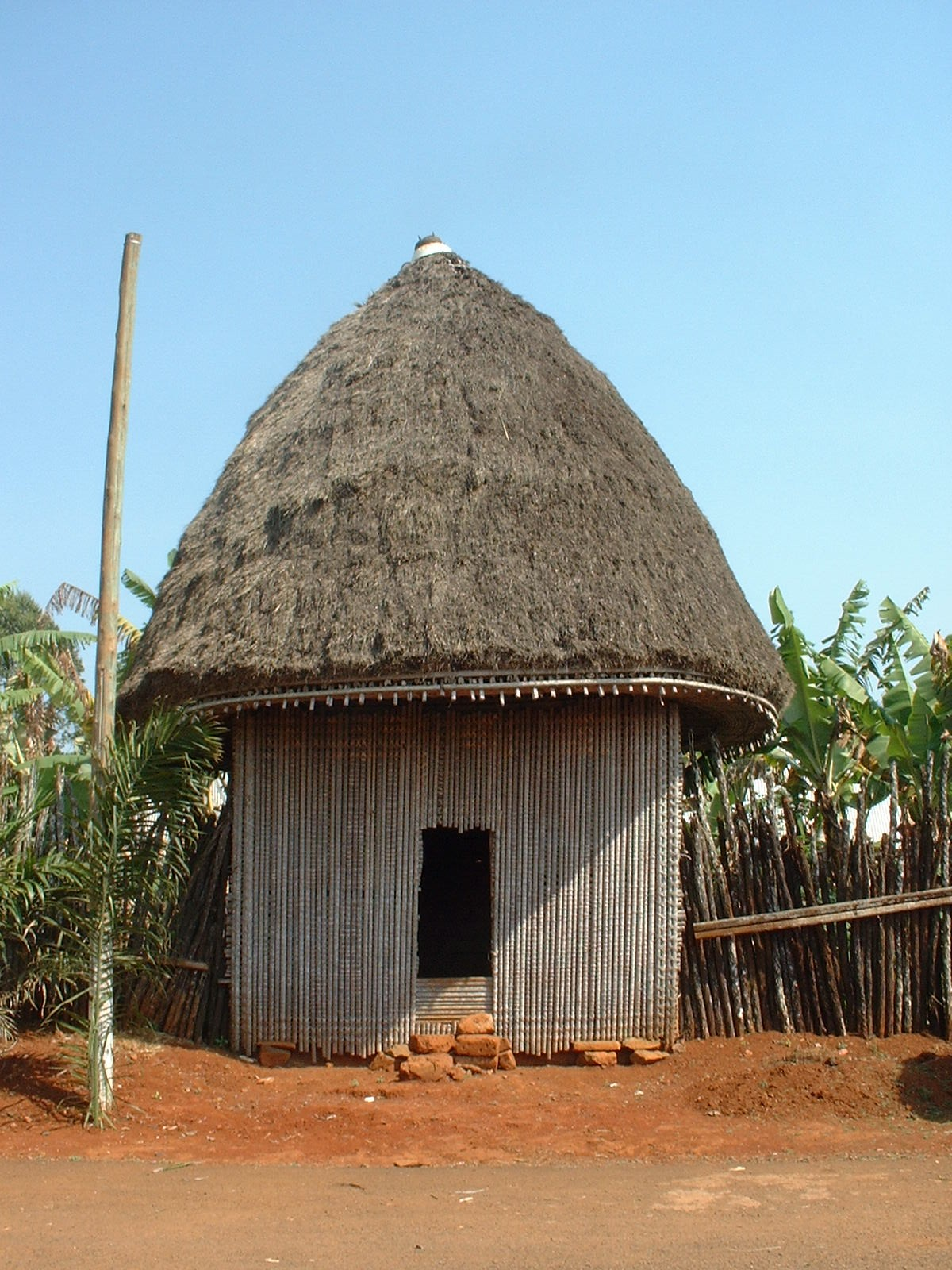
Rondavel in Cameroon

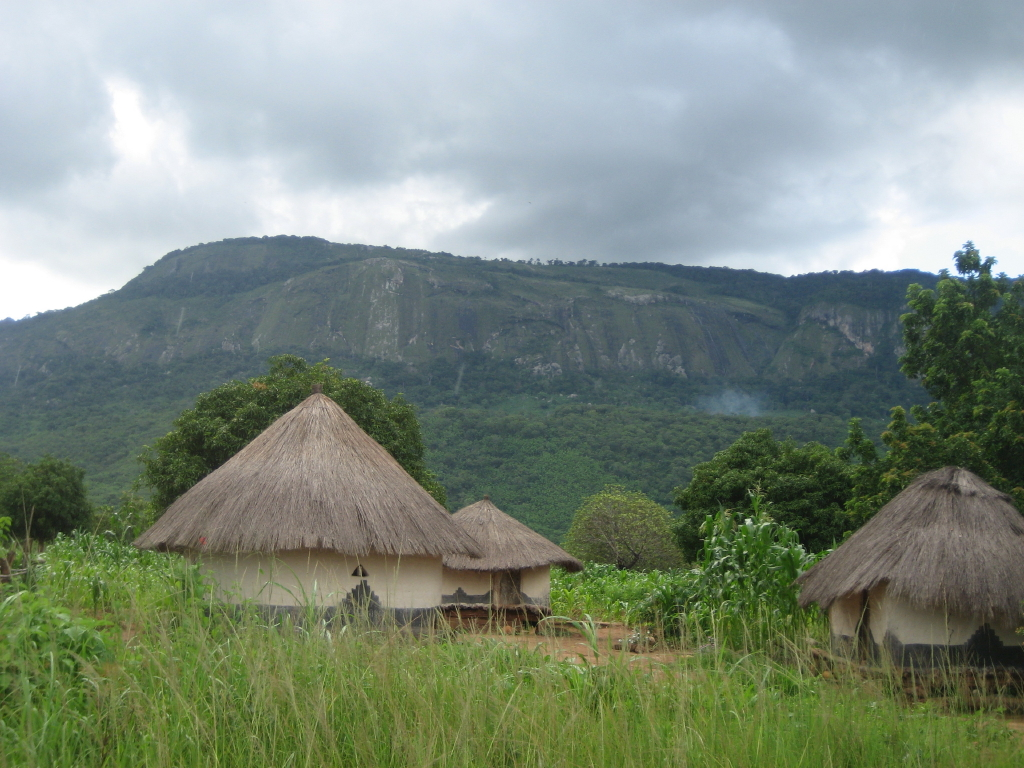
Traditional houses in Tanzania

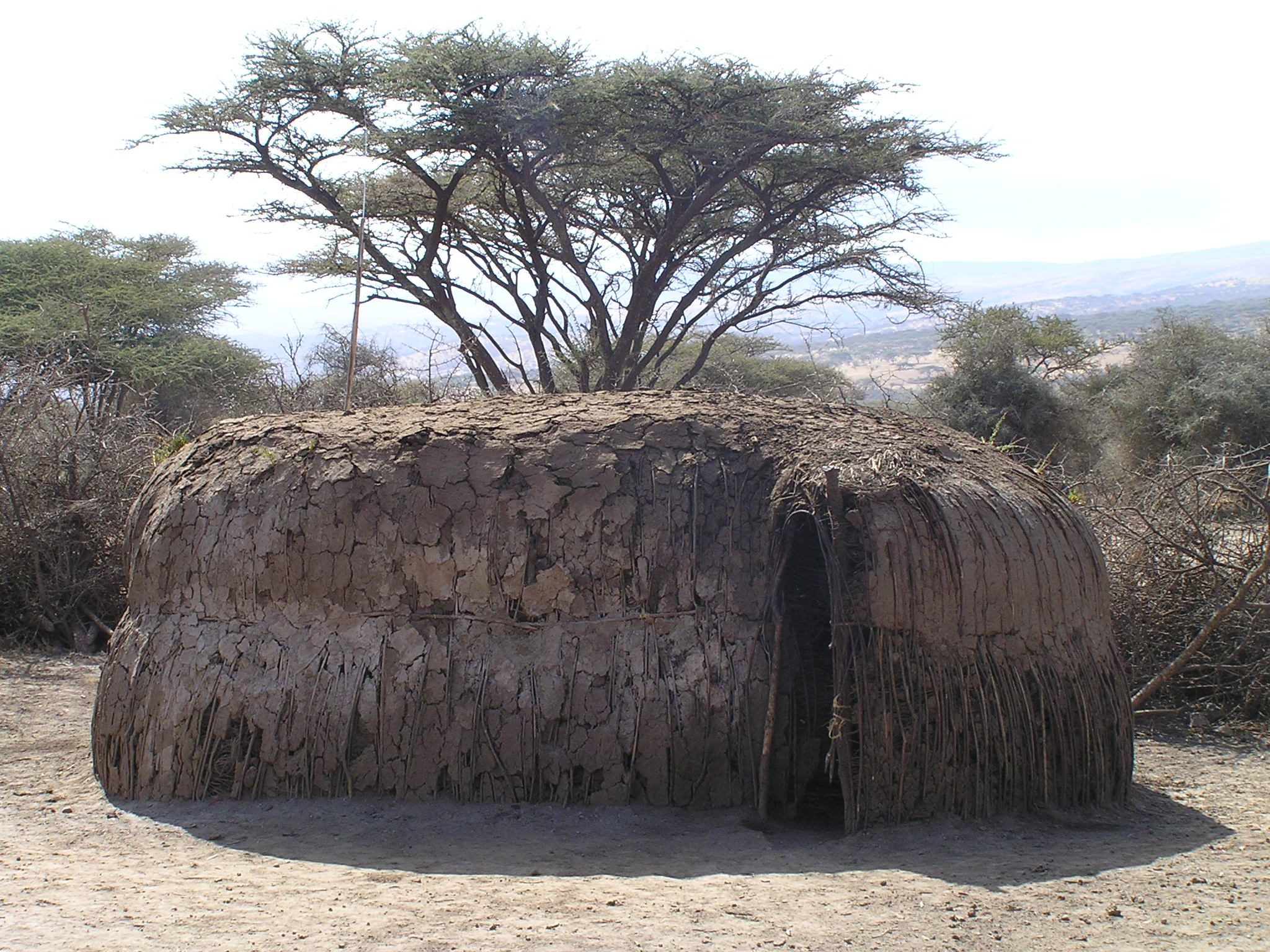
Maasai house in Tanzania

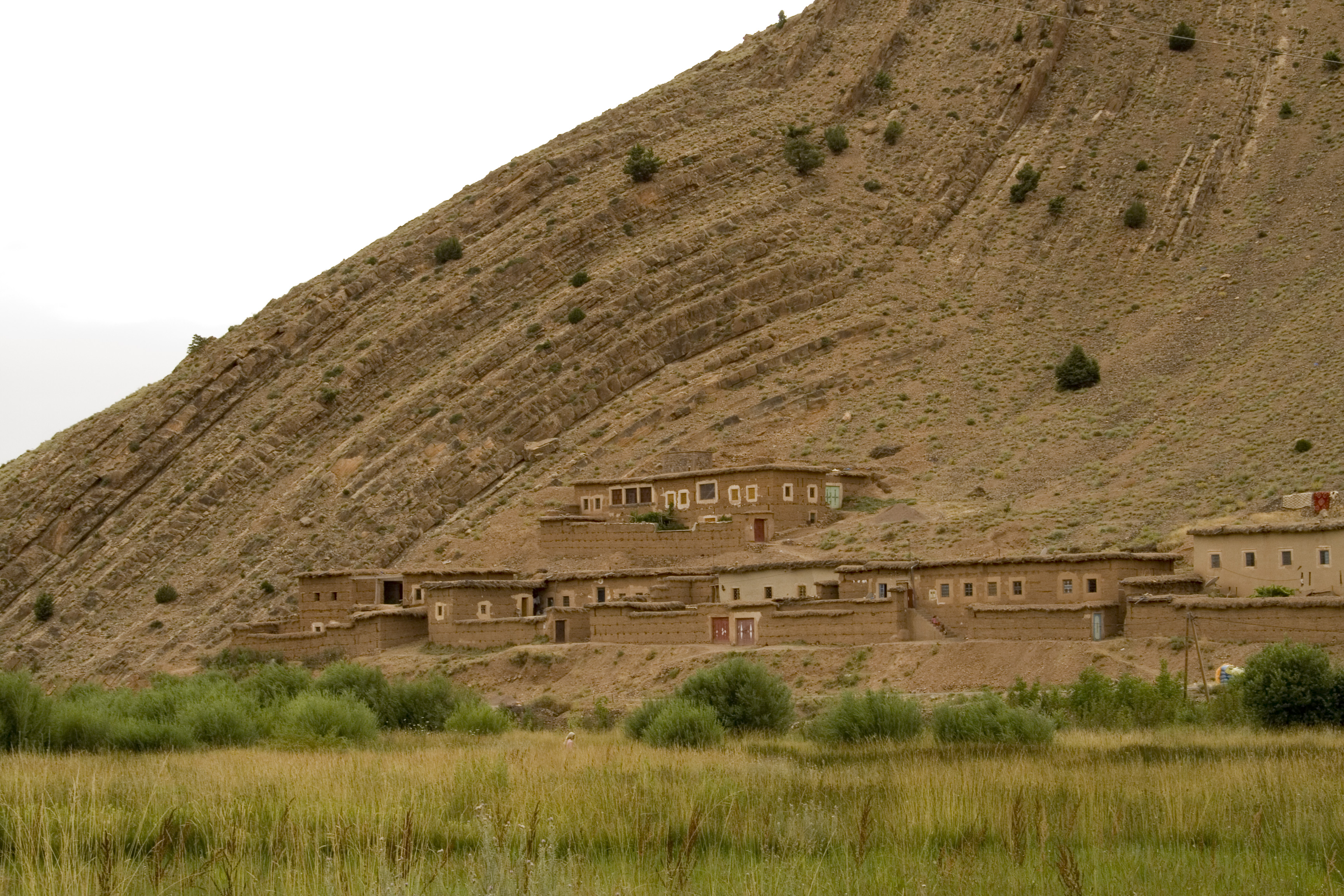
Loam houses in the High Atlas, Aït Bouguemez

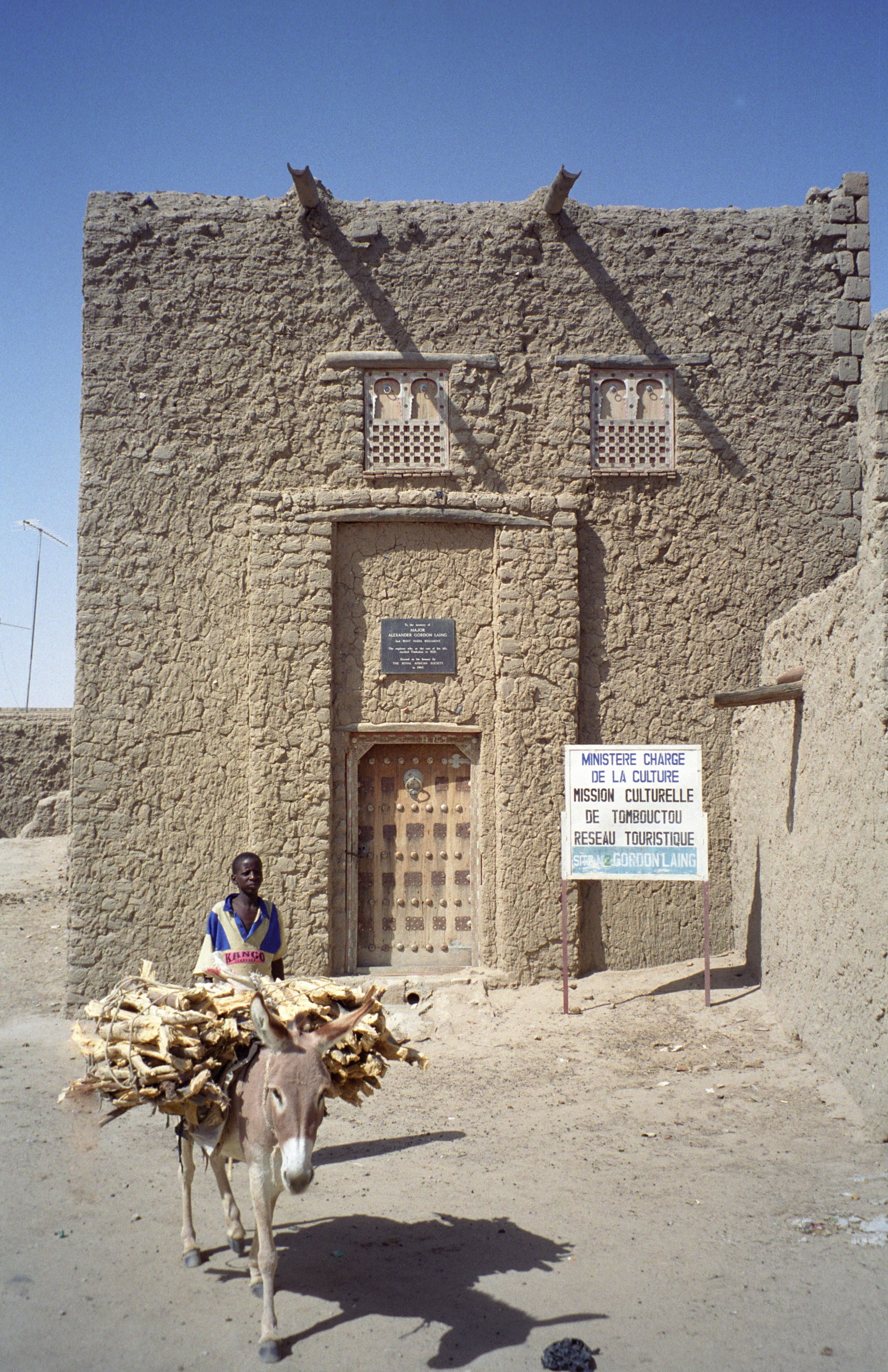
A house in Timbuktu

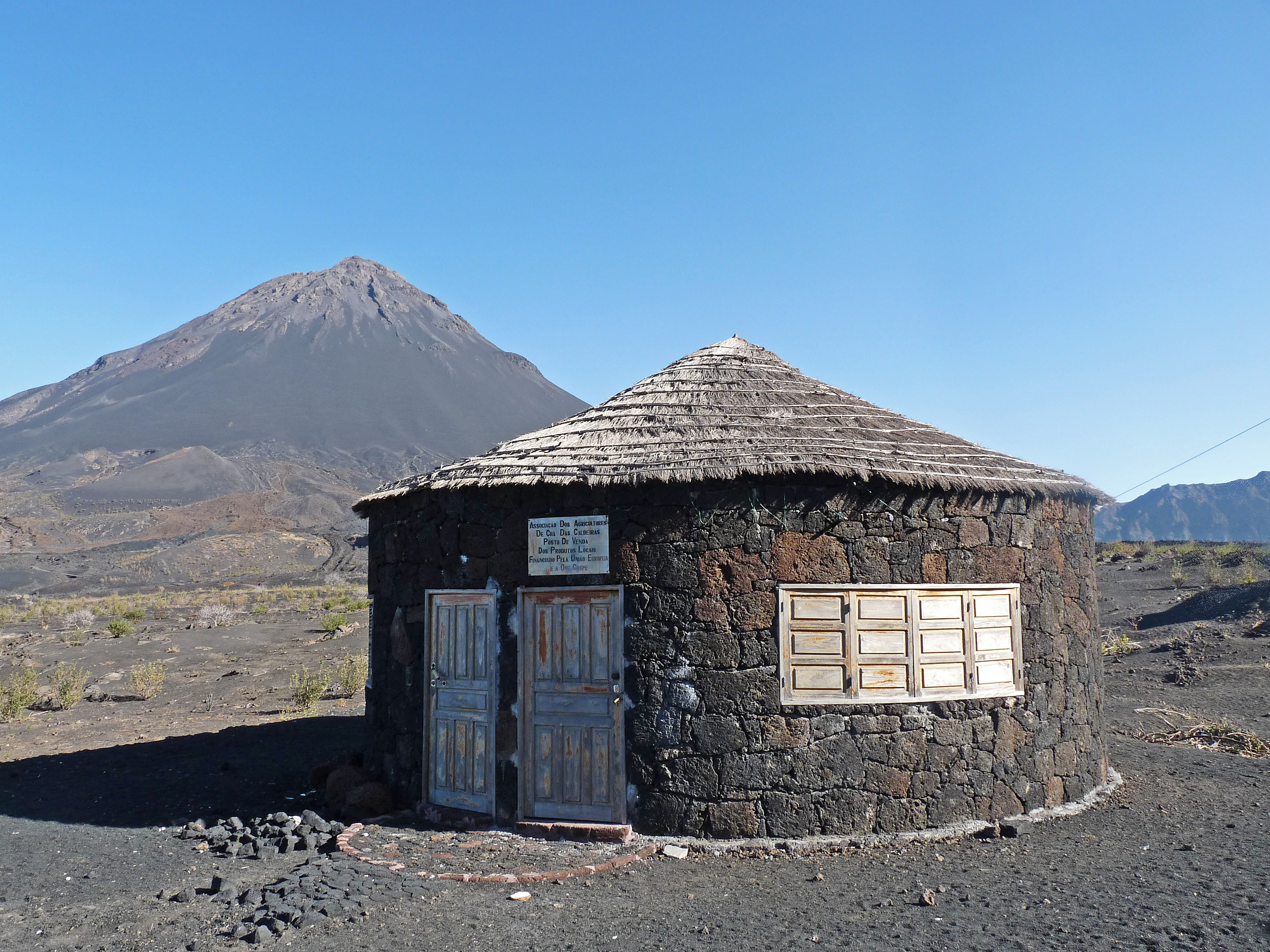
Funco house in Cape Verde

=== Anatolia ===
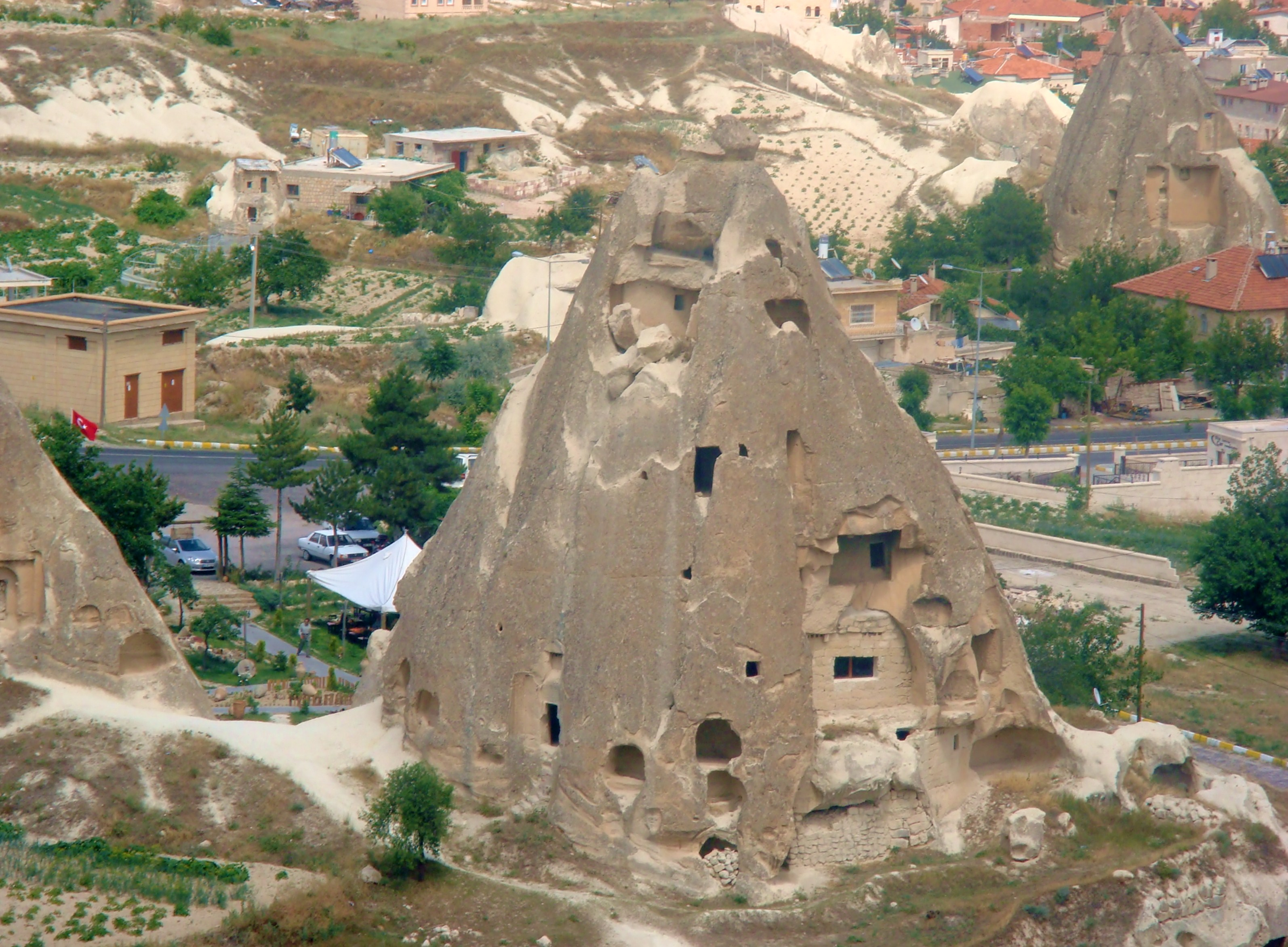
Basalt tuff, rock-cut architecture in Cappadocia, found in central Anatolia and parts of Iran

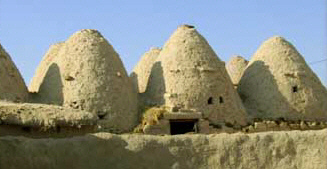
Tholoi type homes have been constructed for millennia in Mesopotamia, like these found in Harran.

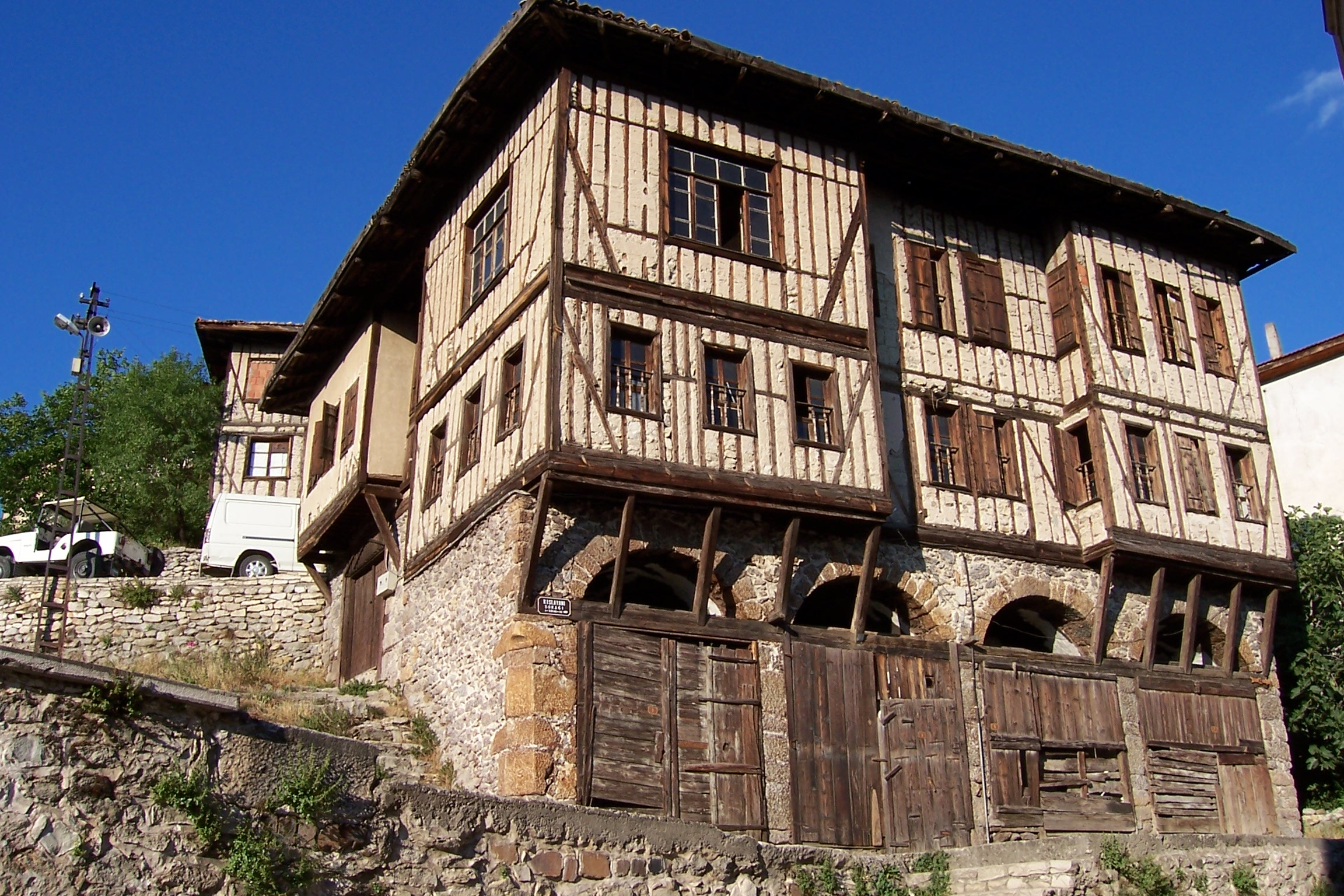
Timber-framed house in Safranbolu, as found in northern Anatolia and European Ottoman territories

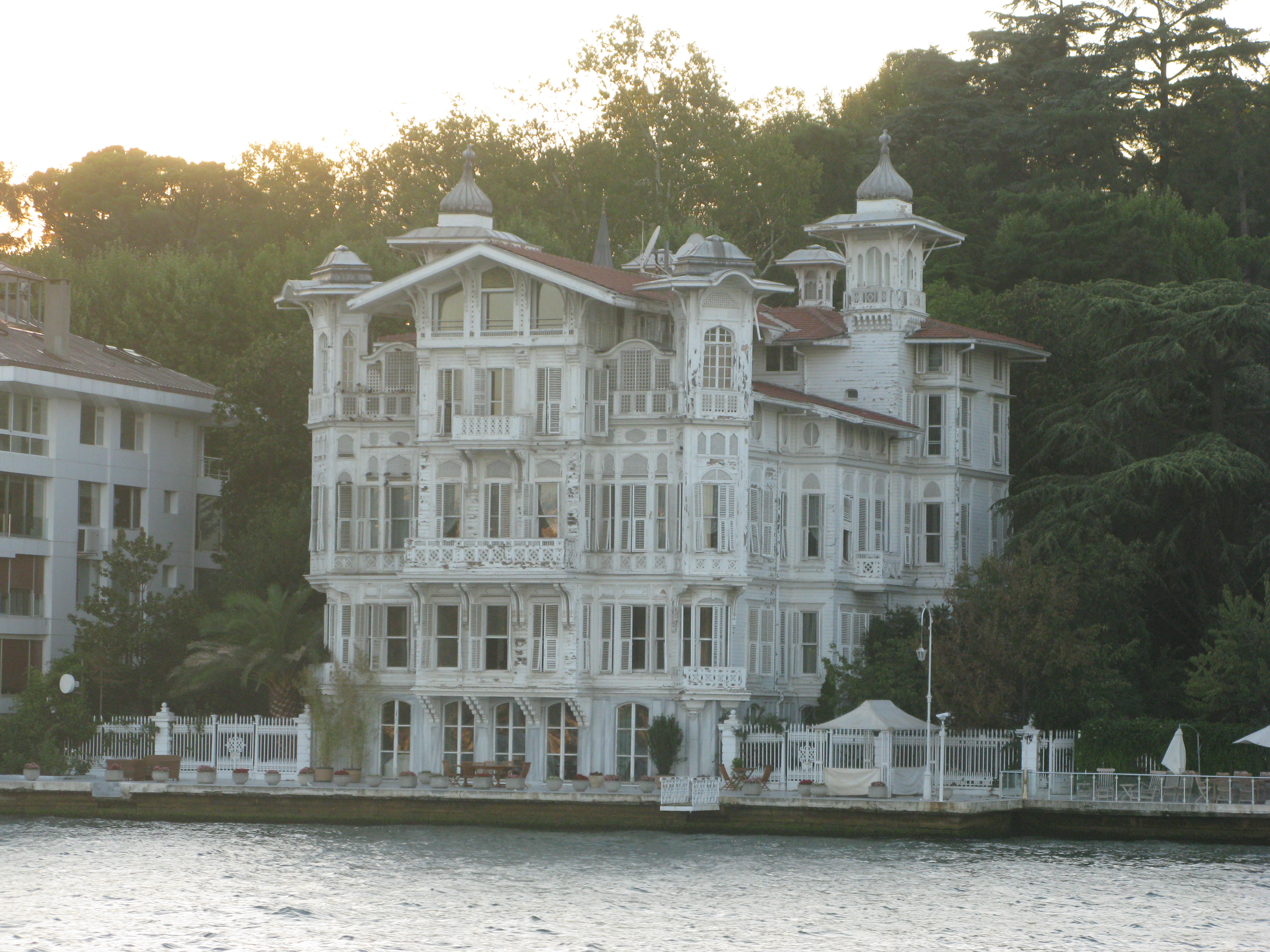
Late Ottoman wooden Yali, a type found on the Bosphorus shore and on the Princes' Islands

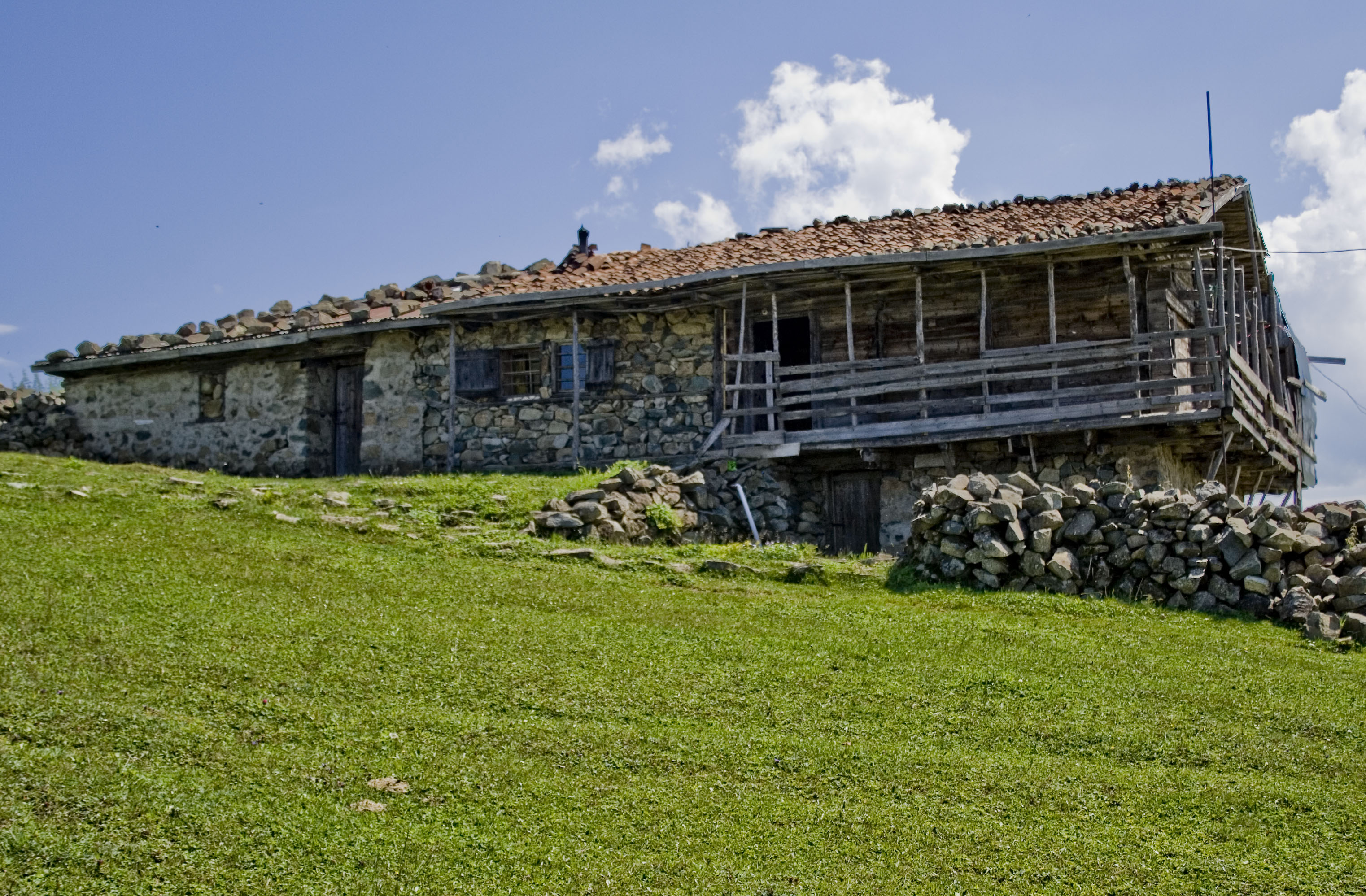
A typical alpine chalet as found in the Pontic Mountains and parts of the Caucasus

=== Central Asia ===
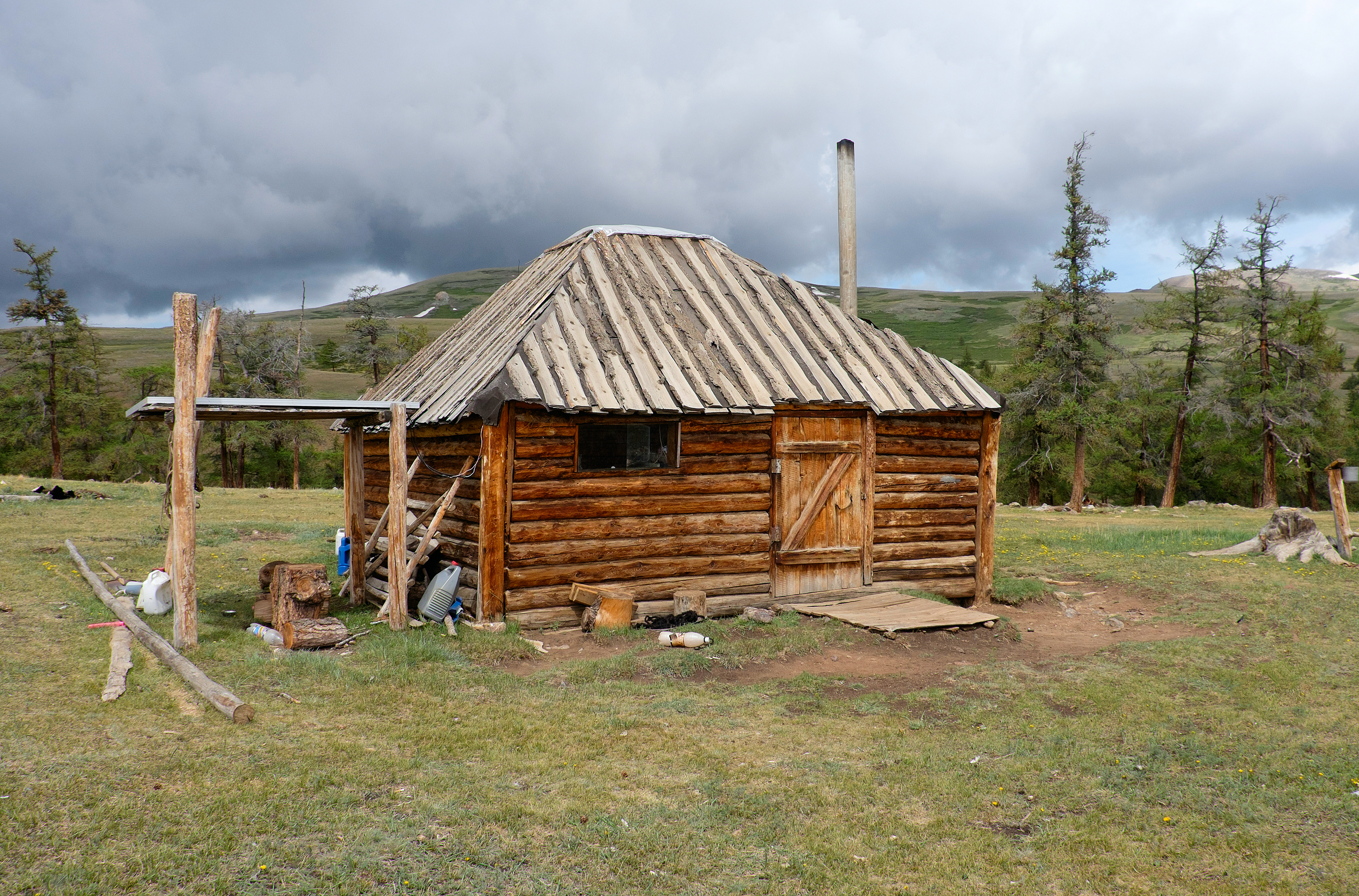
Ayil - herding House in the Altai Mountains

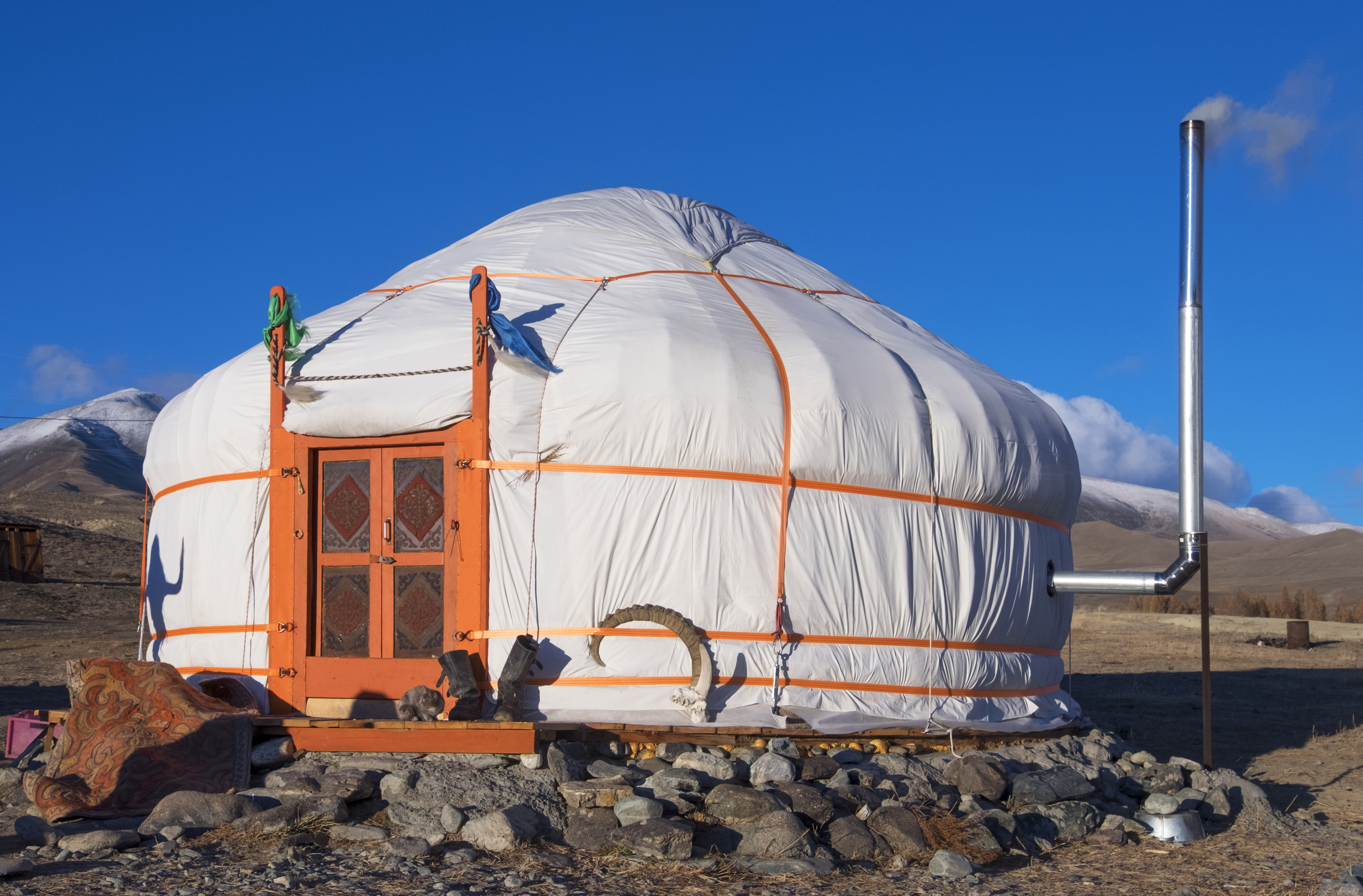
Kazakh yurt in the Altai

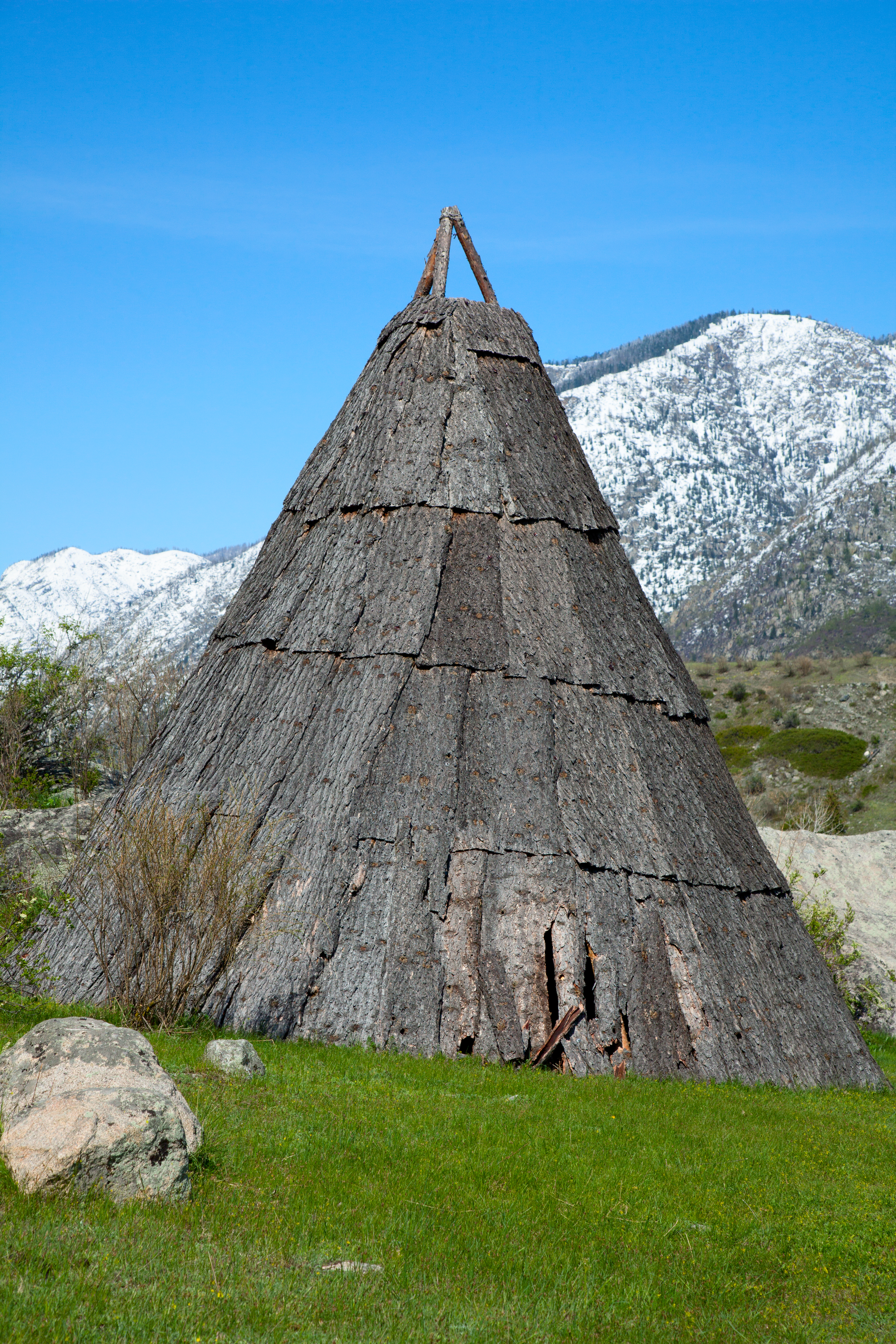
A house made of bark - Aalachic, Altai Mountains

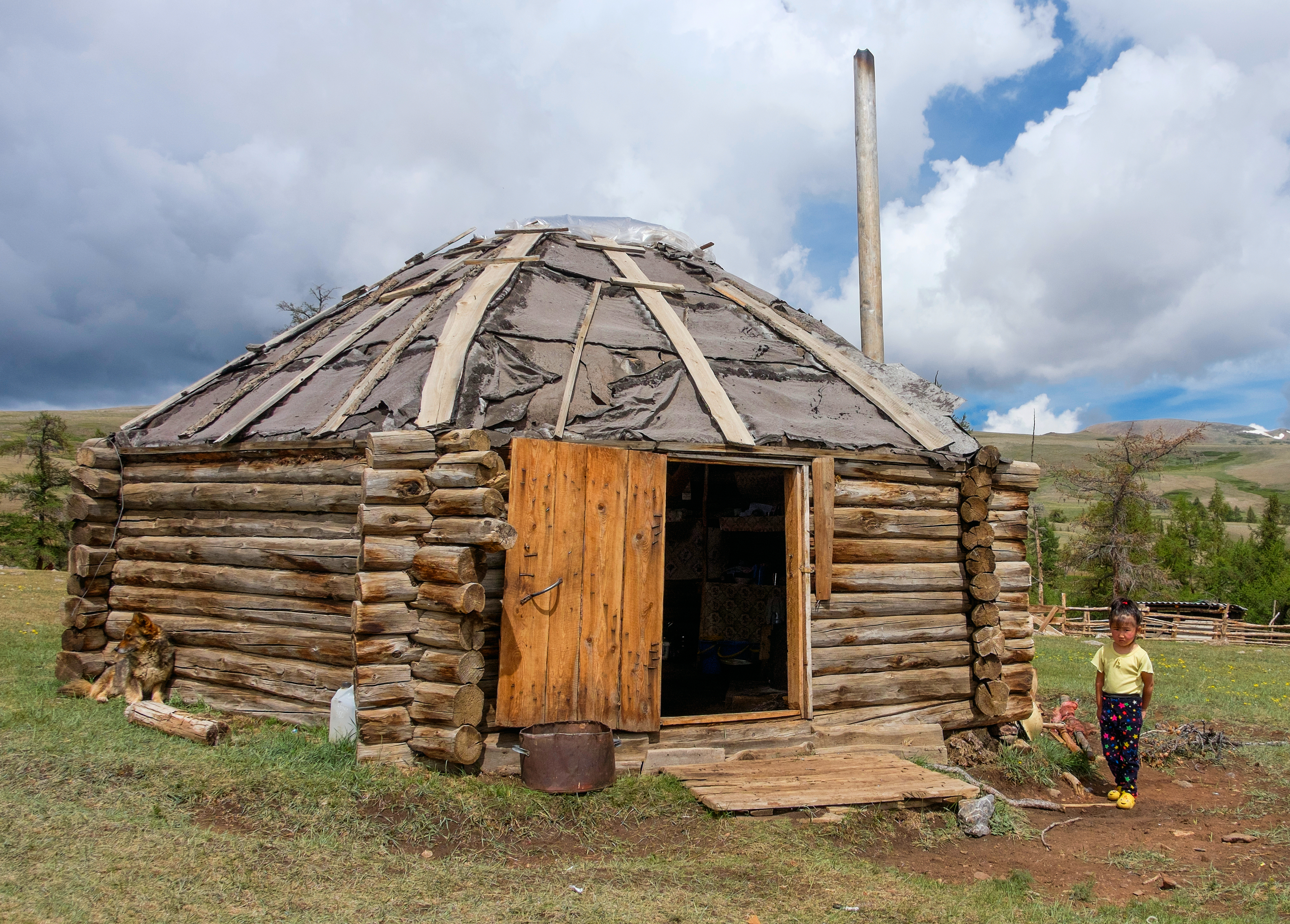
Shepherd's house in the mountains. Kosh-Agach.

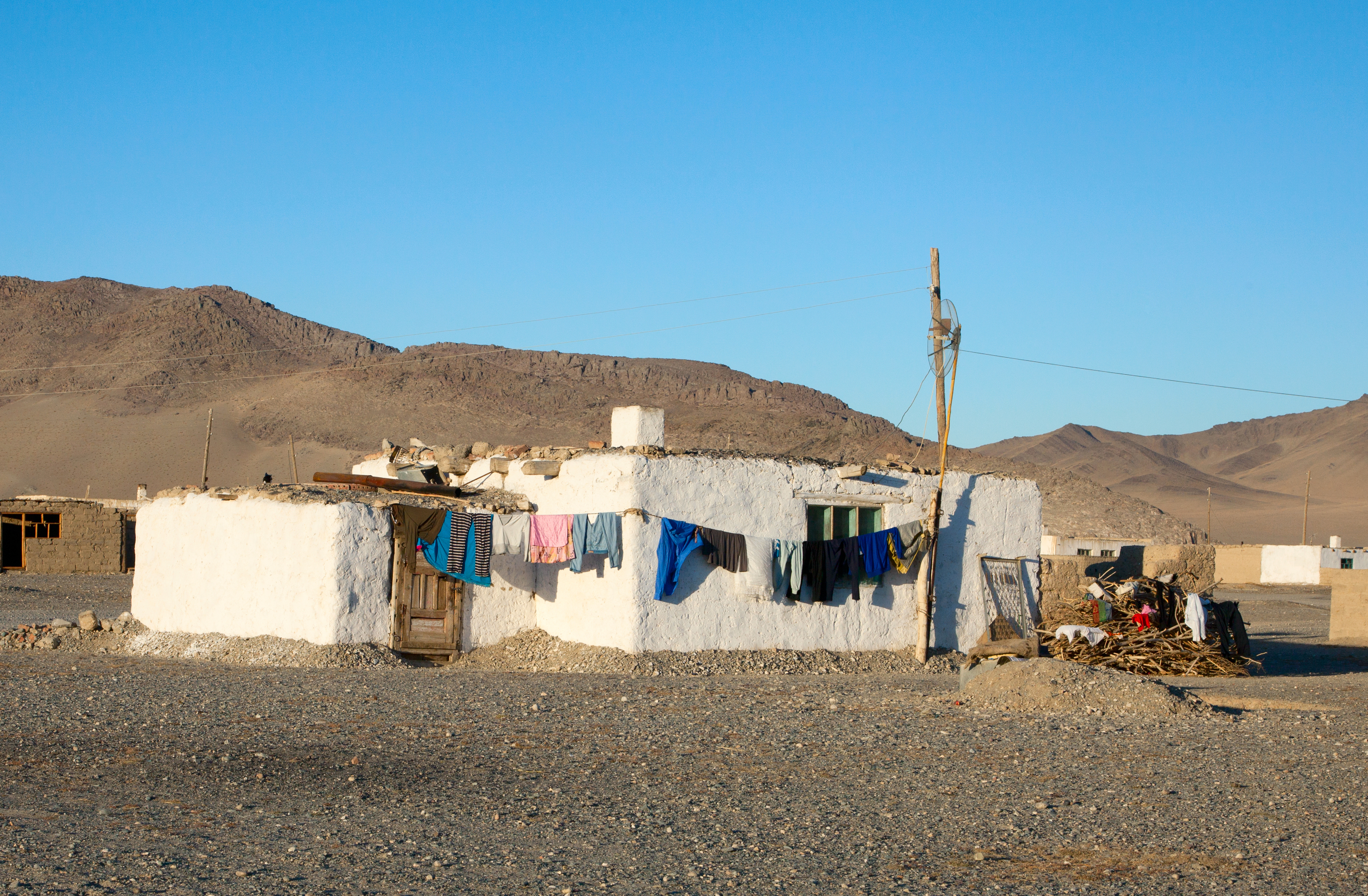
North-Western Mongolia, Ölgii city

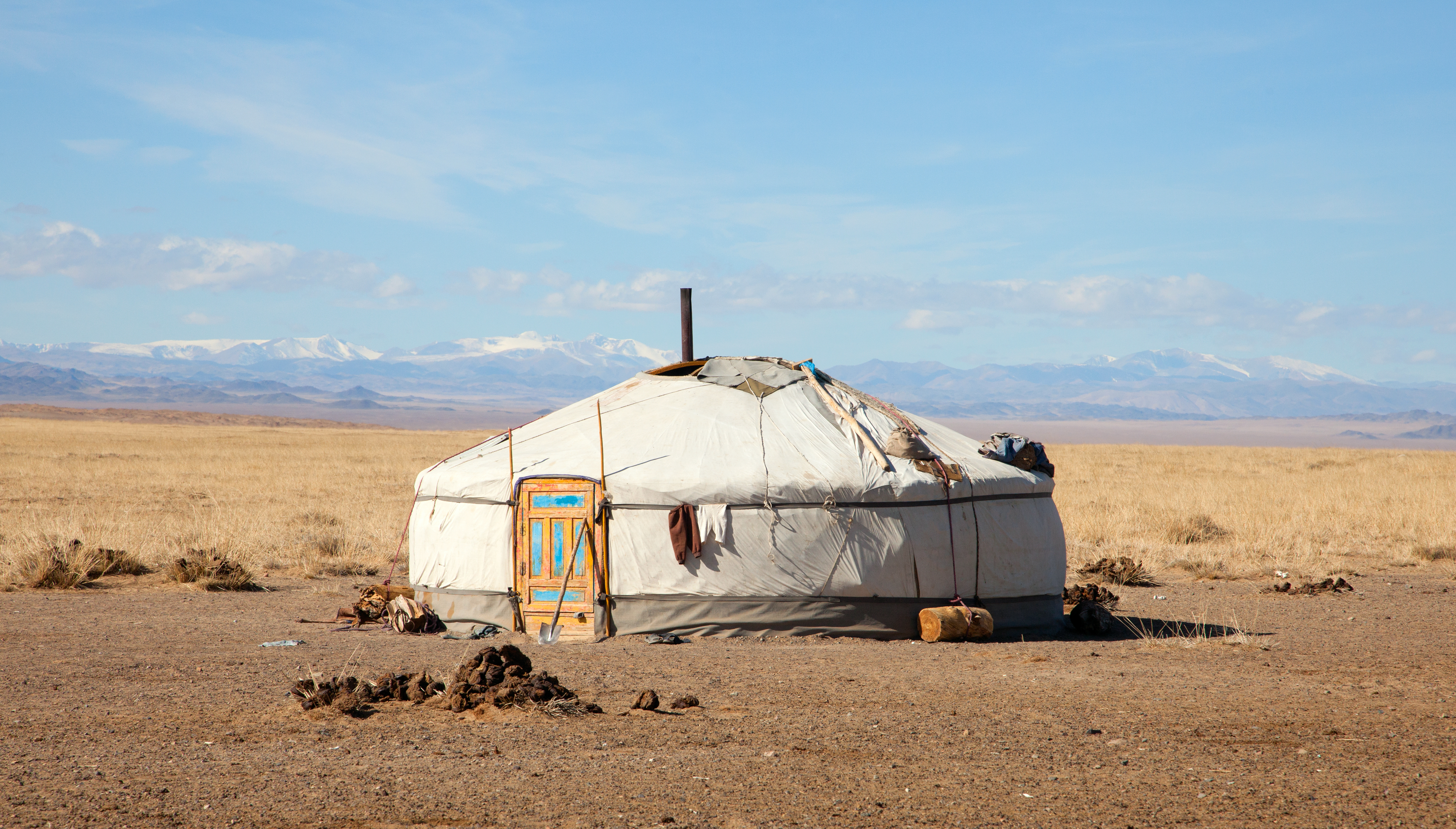
Mongolian nomad yurt

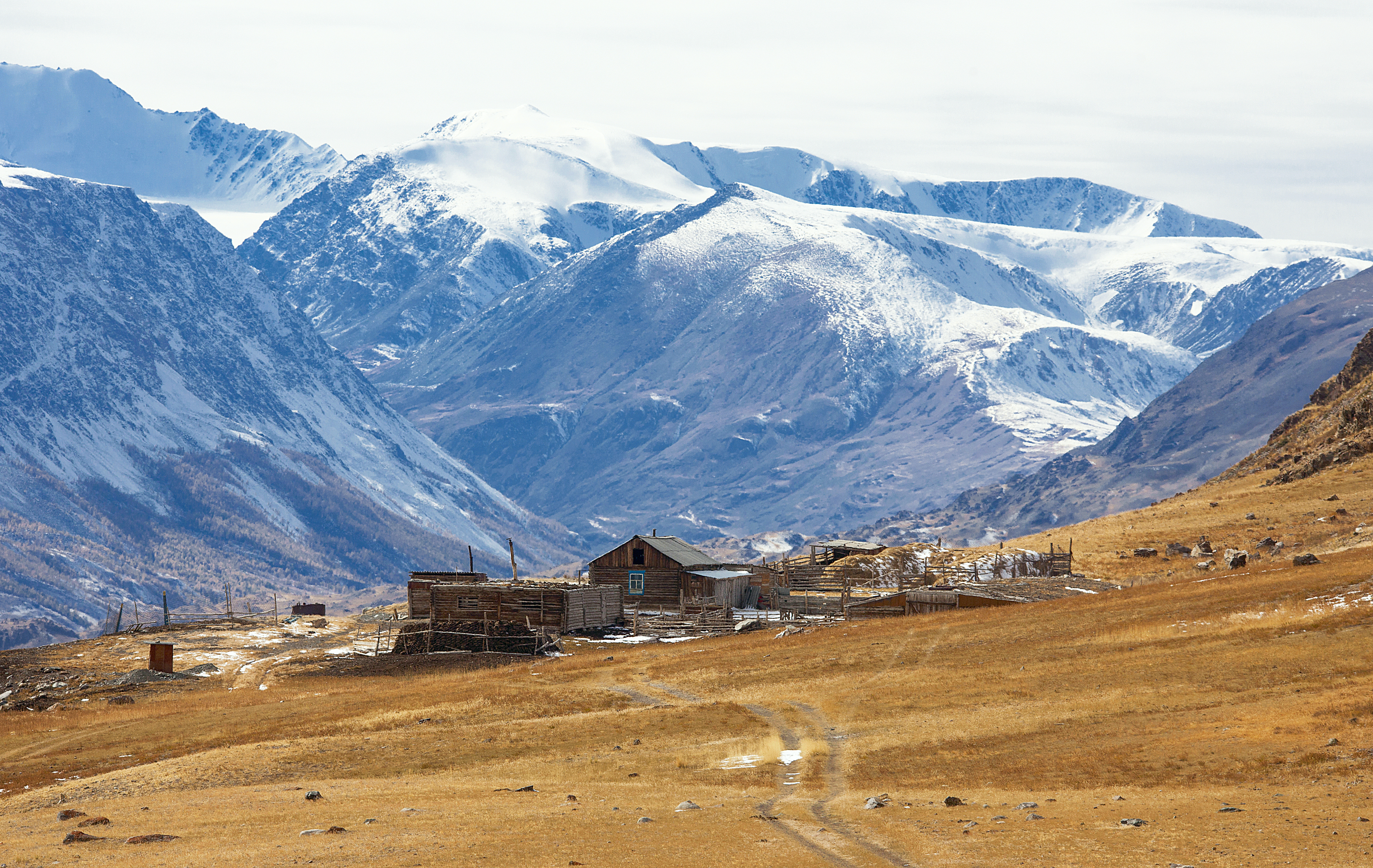
Animal Farm in the Altai Mountains

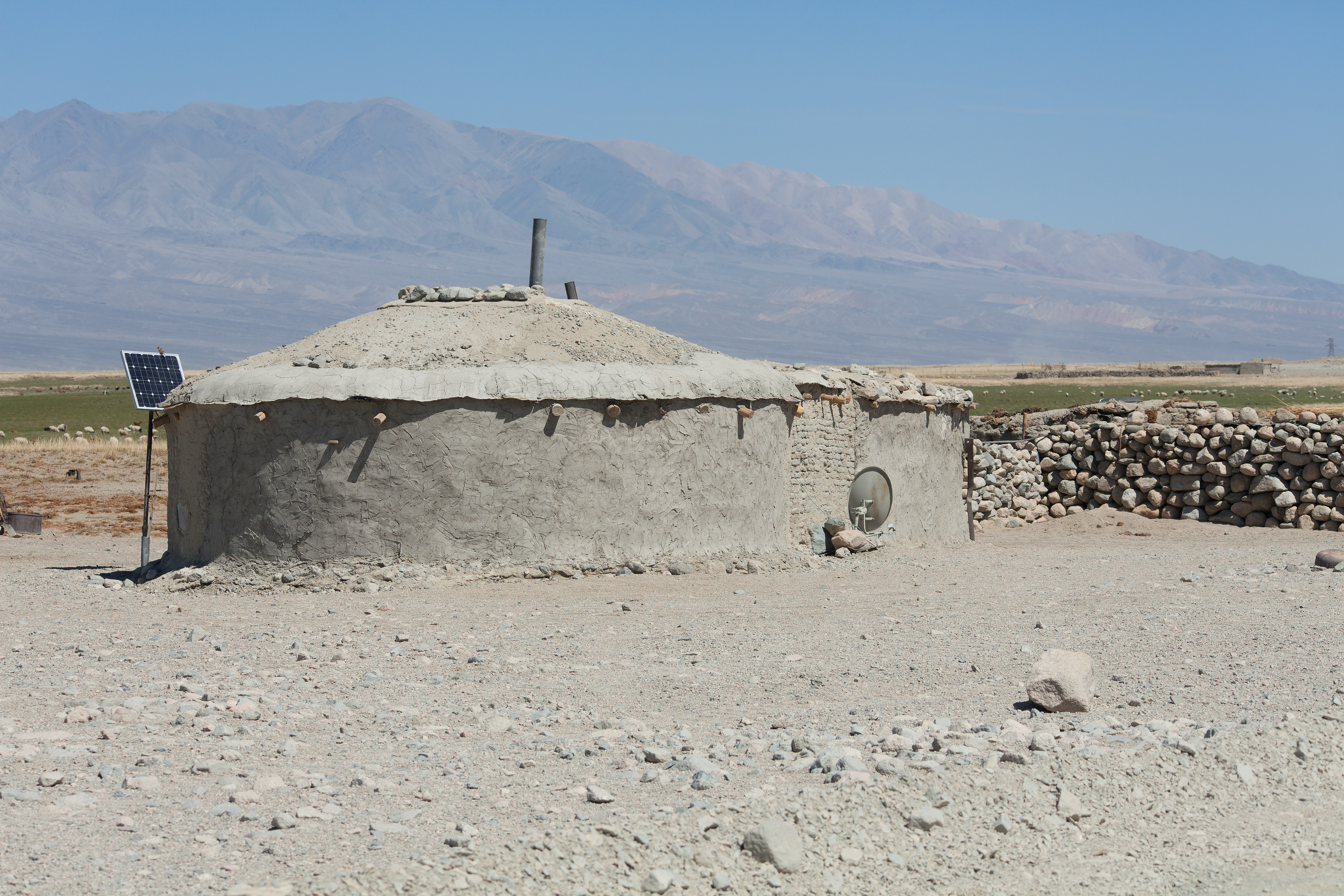
Stone yurt in Mongolia

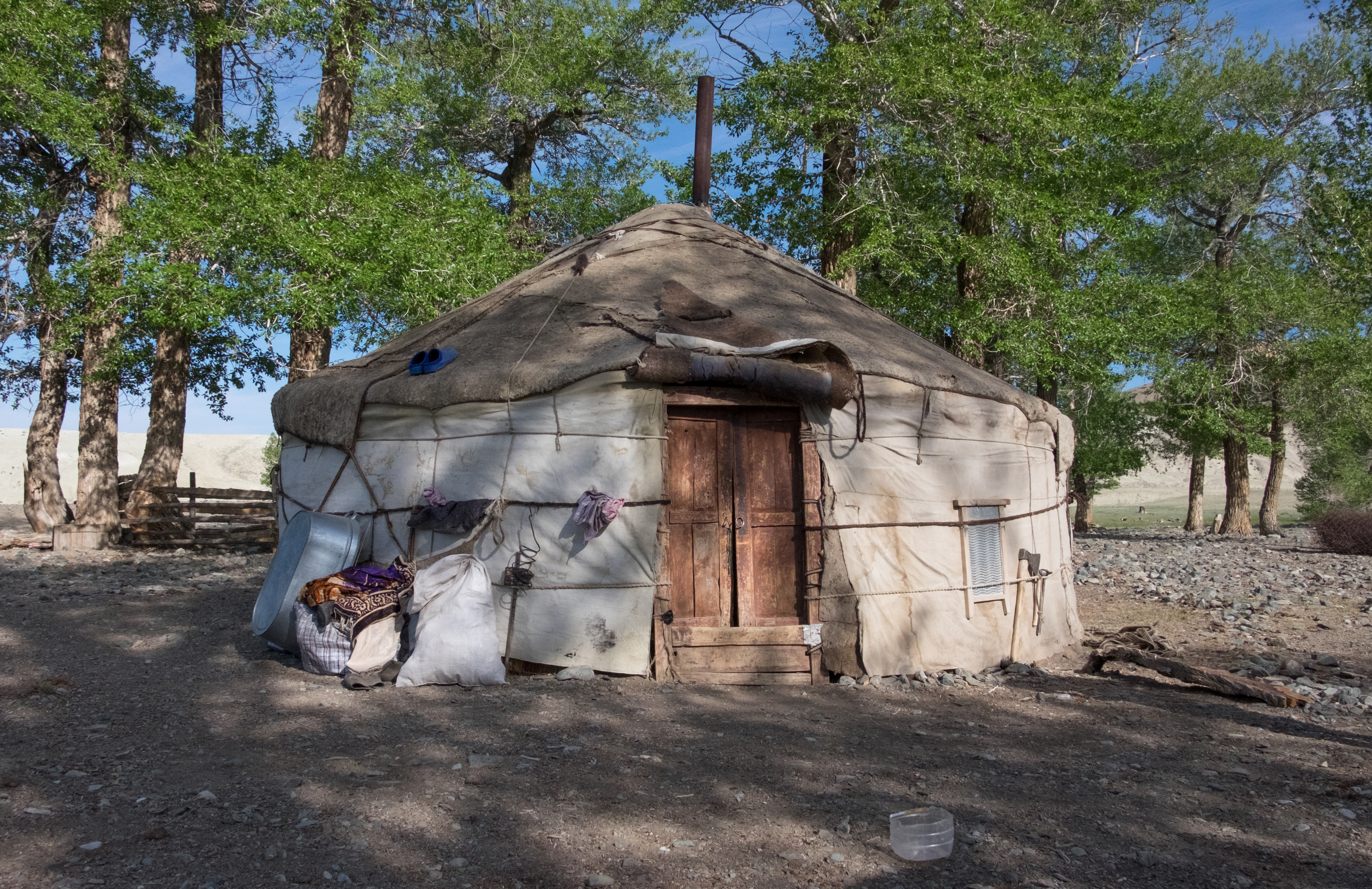
Telengits yurt in Altai

=== Middle East ===
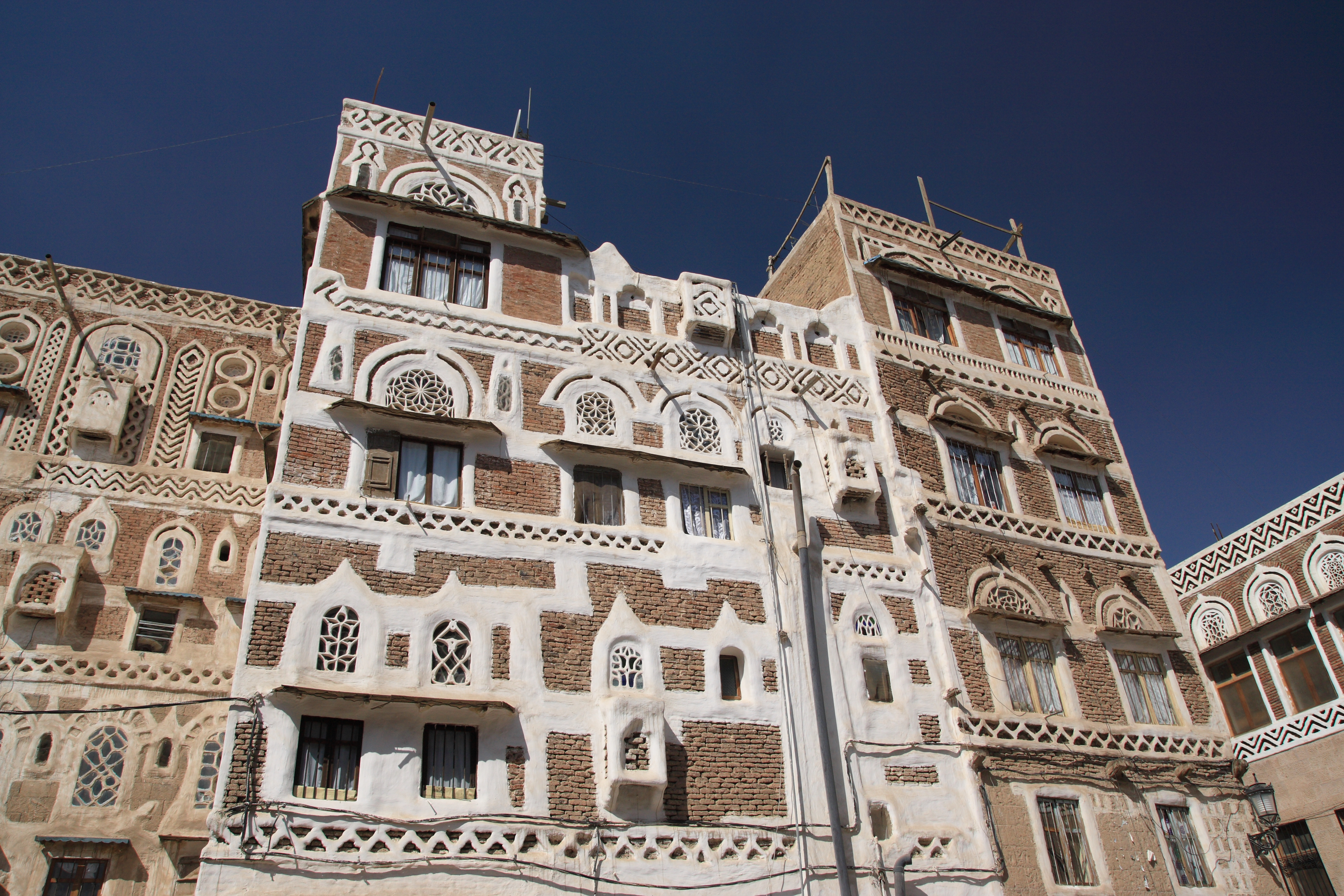
Traditional Yemeni house in Sanaa

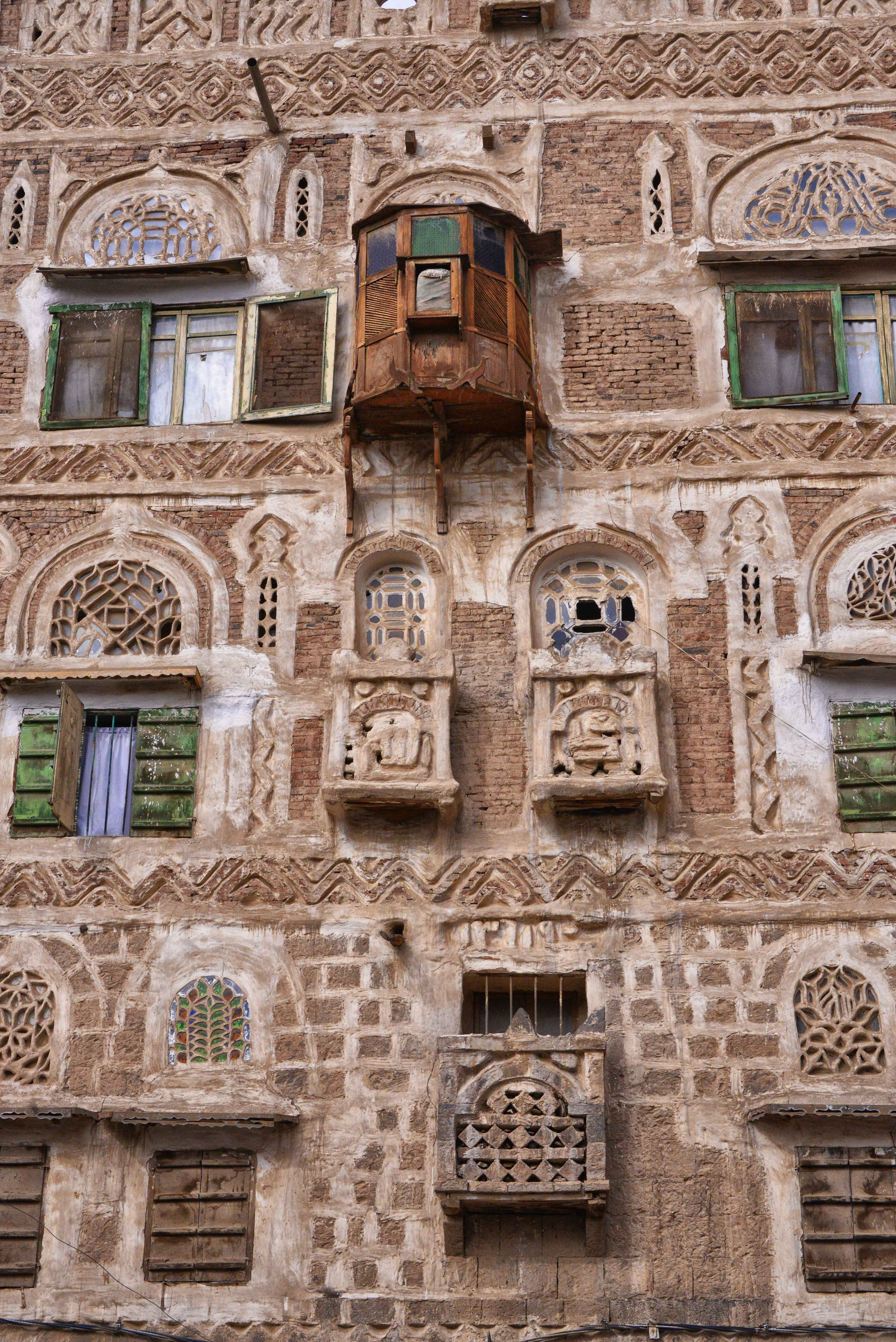
Traditional Yemeni house in Sanaa

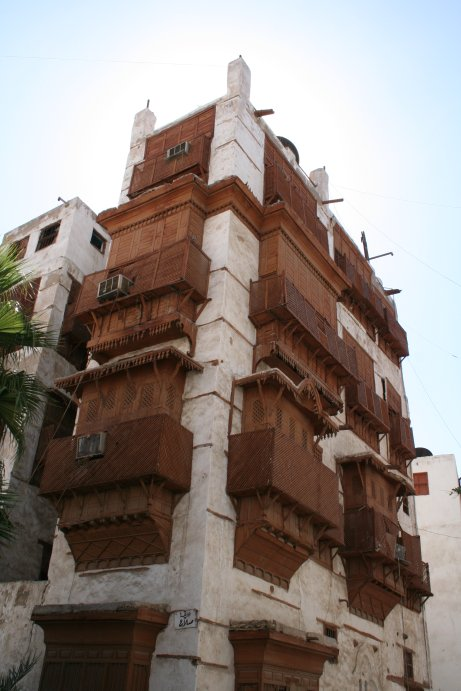
Traditional architecture of the Hejaz, Al-Balad, Jeddah

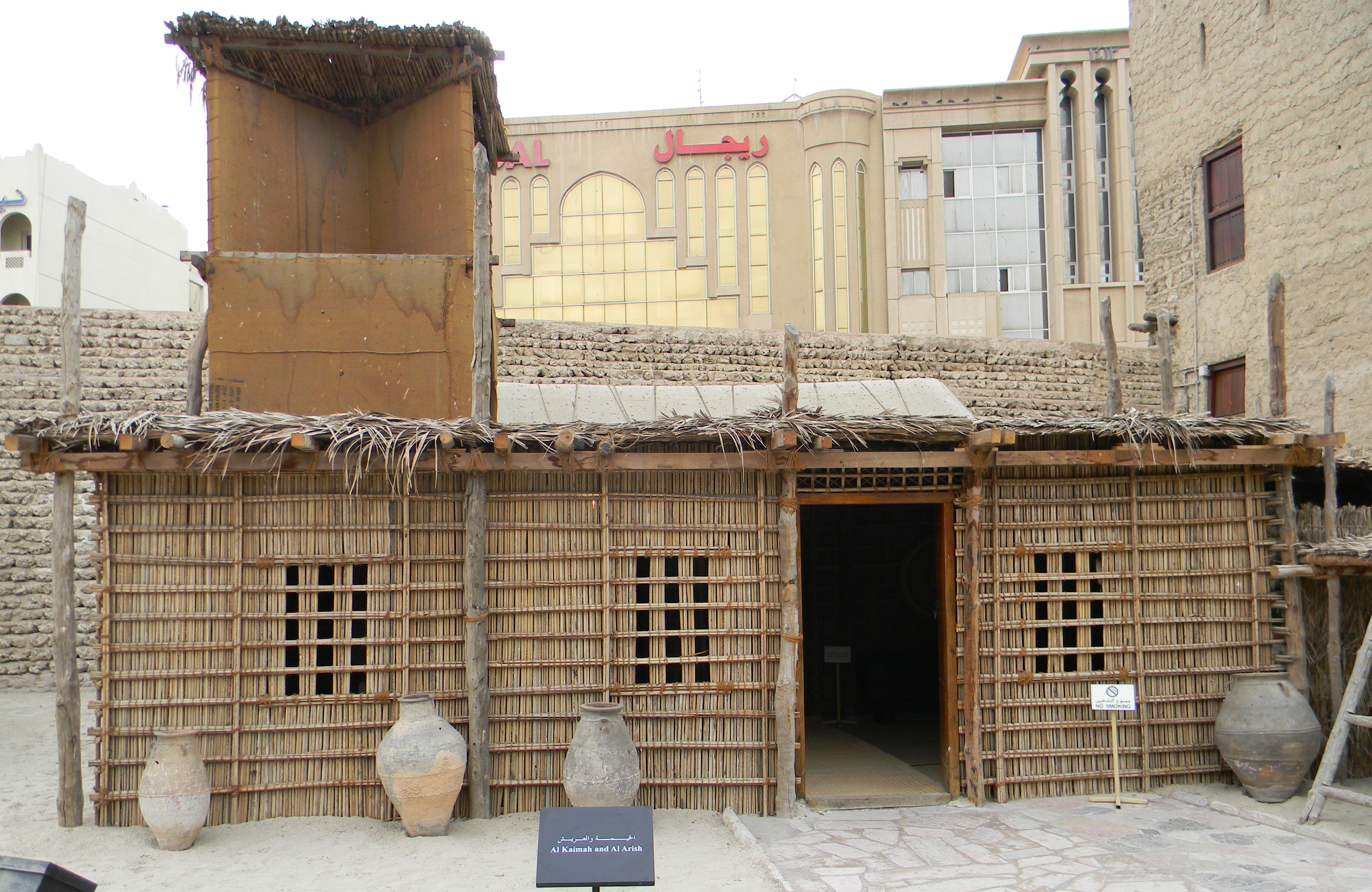
Replica of a vernacular house in Dubai, including a windcatcher

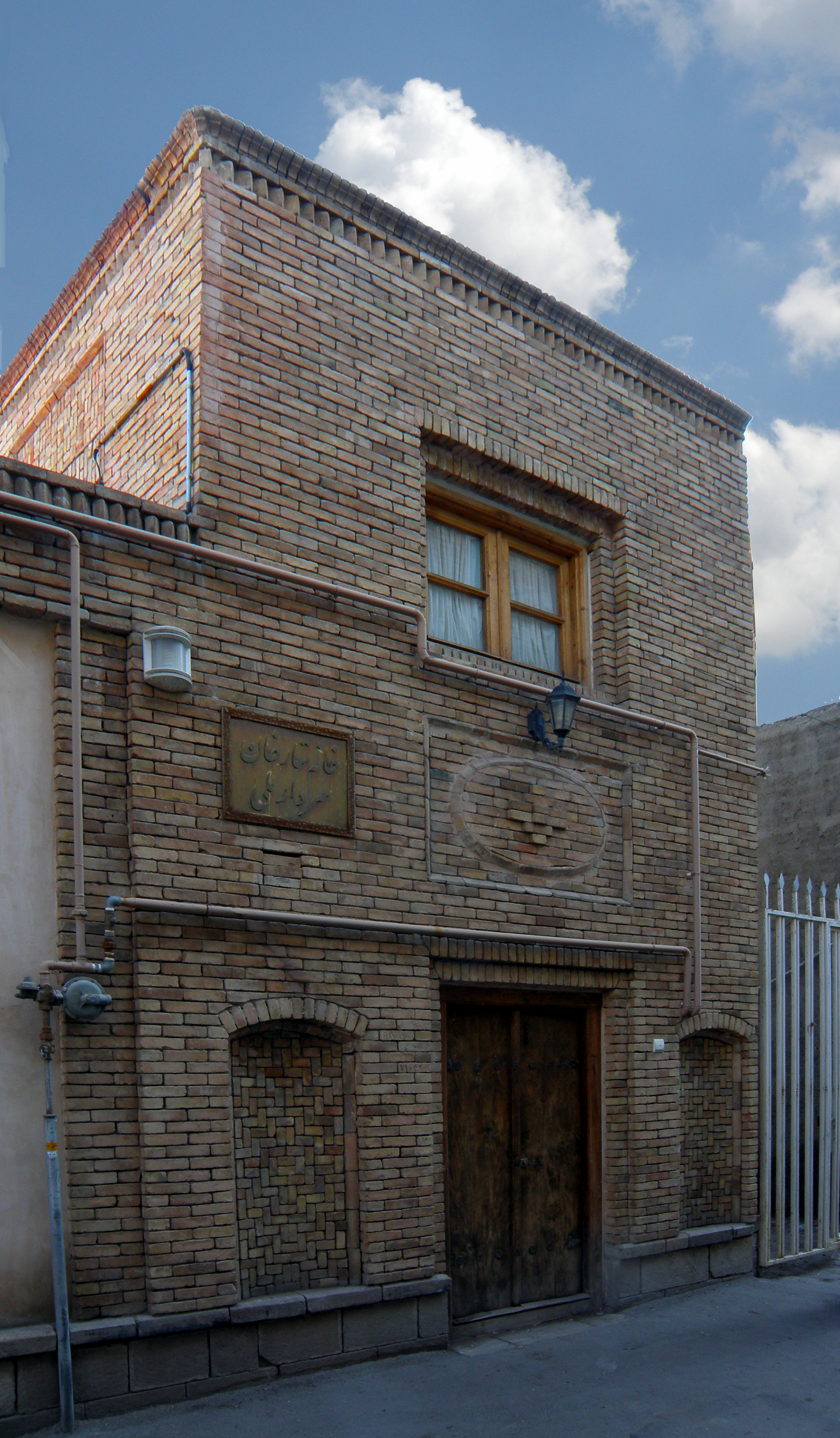
Traditional brick house of Iran and Central Asia, Tabriz

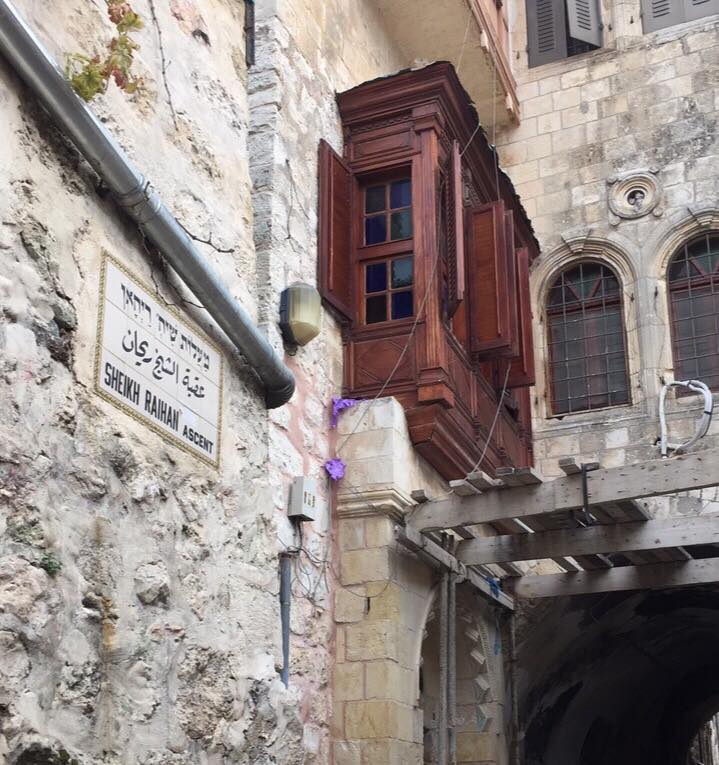
The mashrabiya (a type of oriel window) is a characteristic feature of upper-class homes across the region as in this example from Jerusalem.

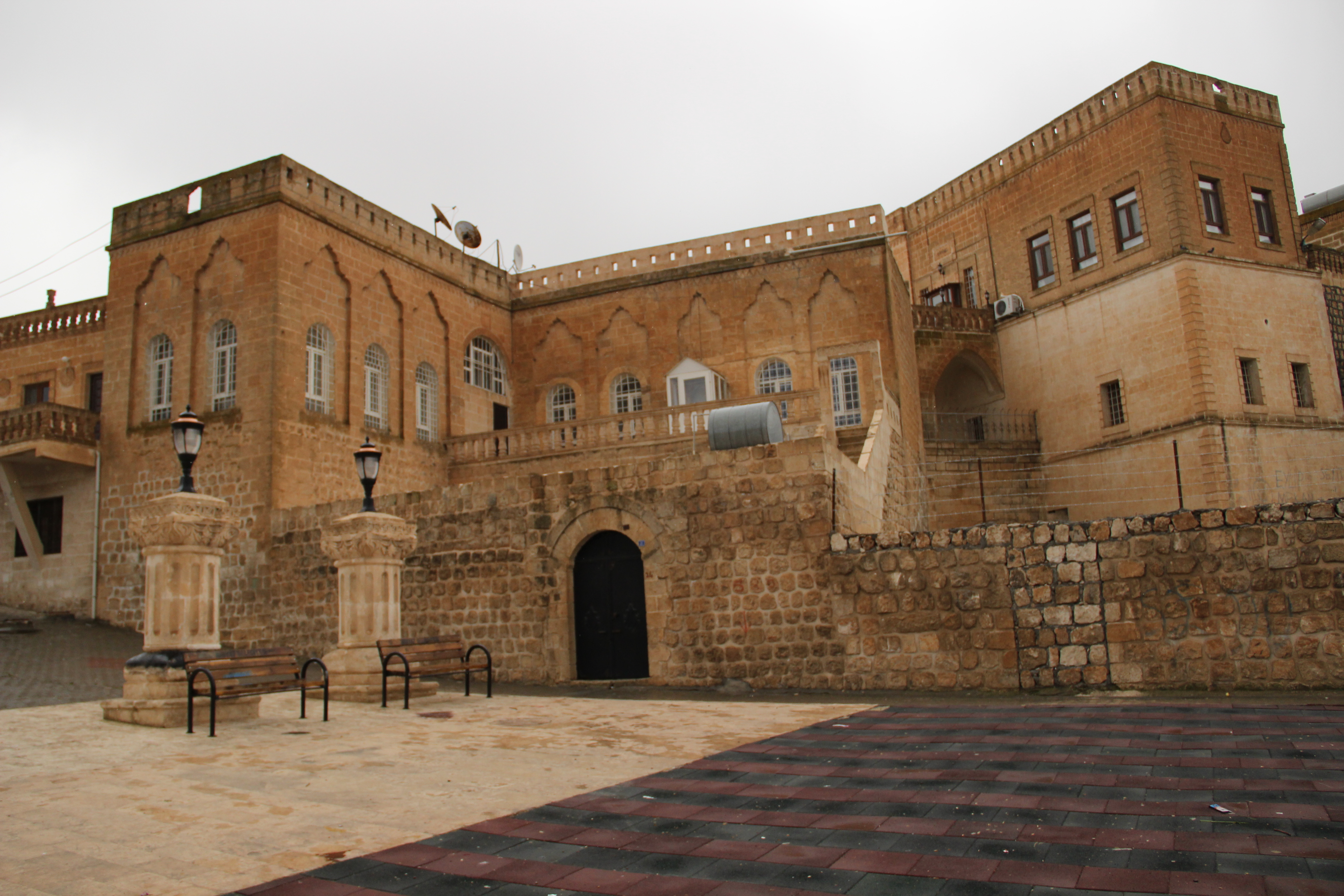
Traditional House in Midyat, Southern Turkey

=== South Asia ===
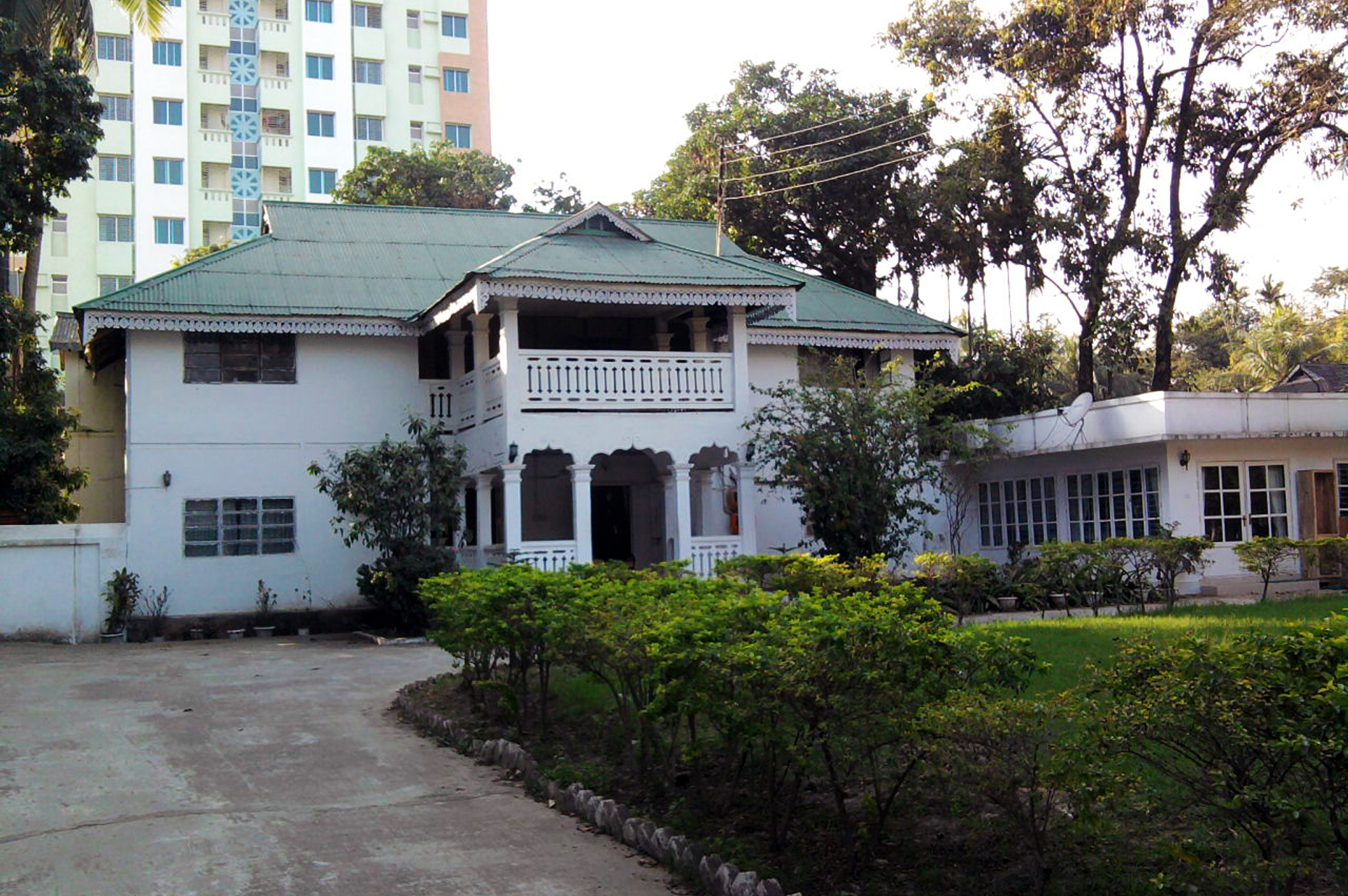
The origin of the vernacular bungalow has its roots in Bengal, Bangladesh.

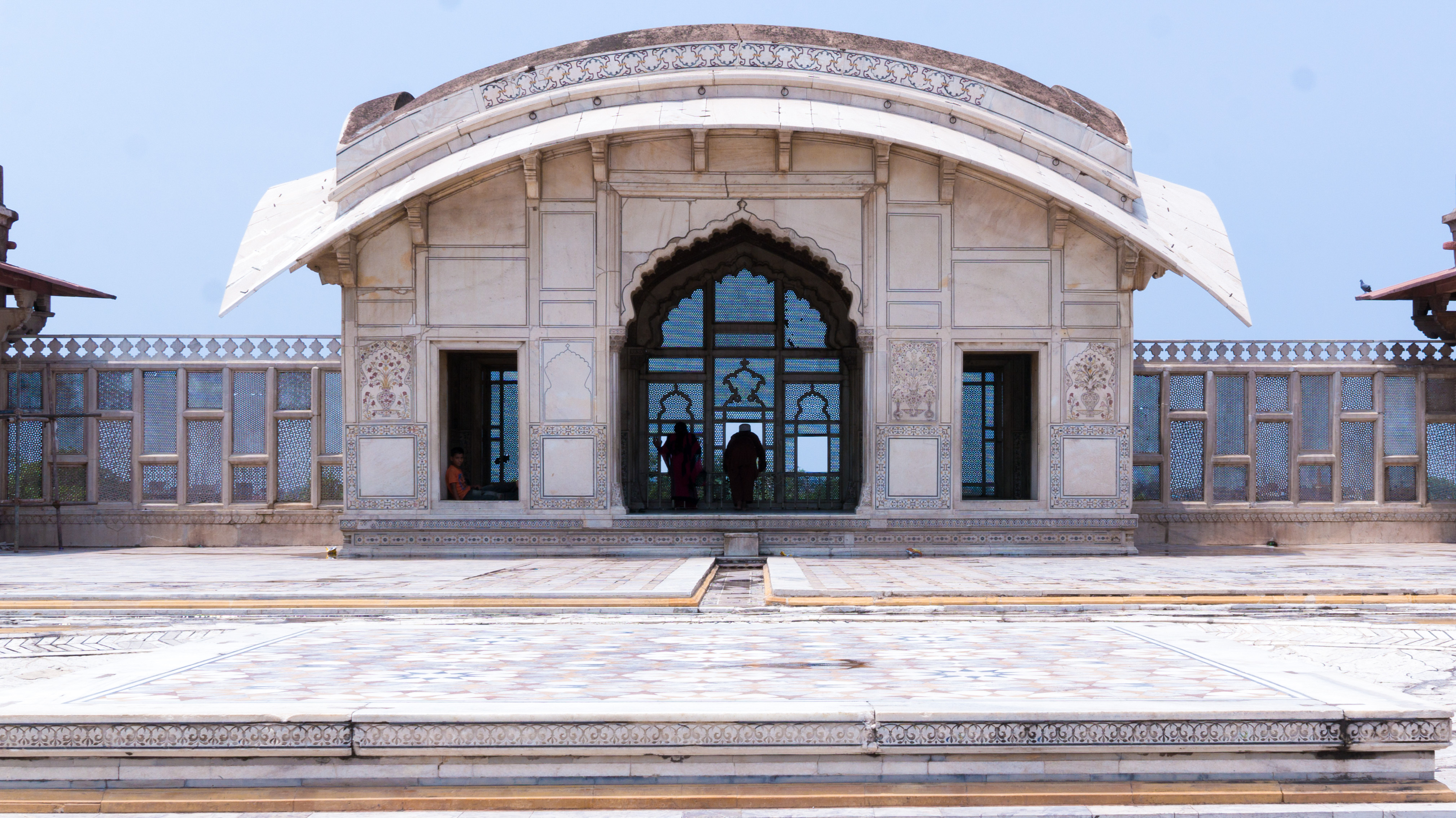
The Naulakha Pavilion in Lahore Fort, Pakistan, features a Do-chala roof originating in Bengal.

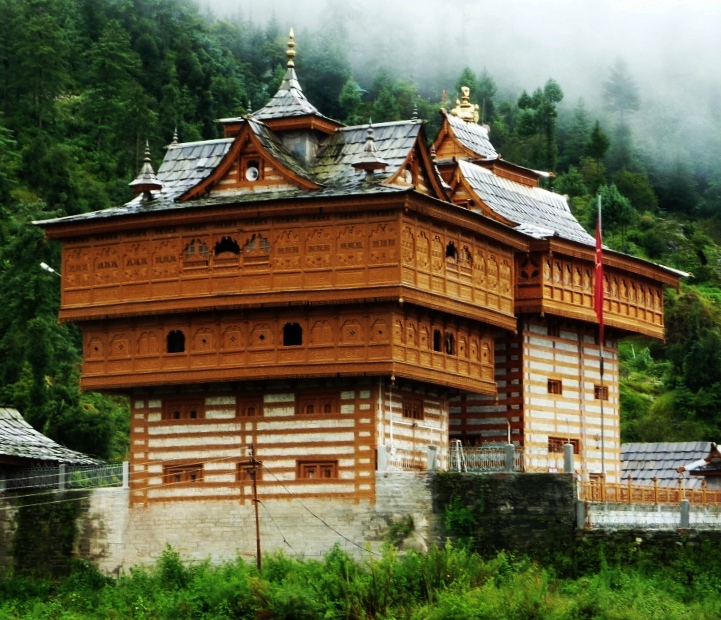
Bhimakali temple, built in Kath-Kuni style of architecture, Indian vernacular architecture

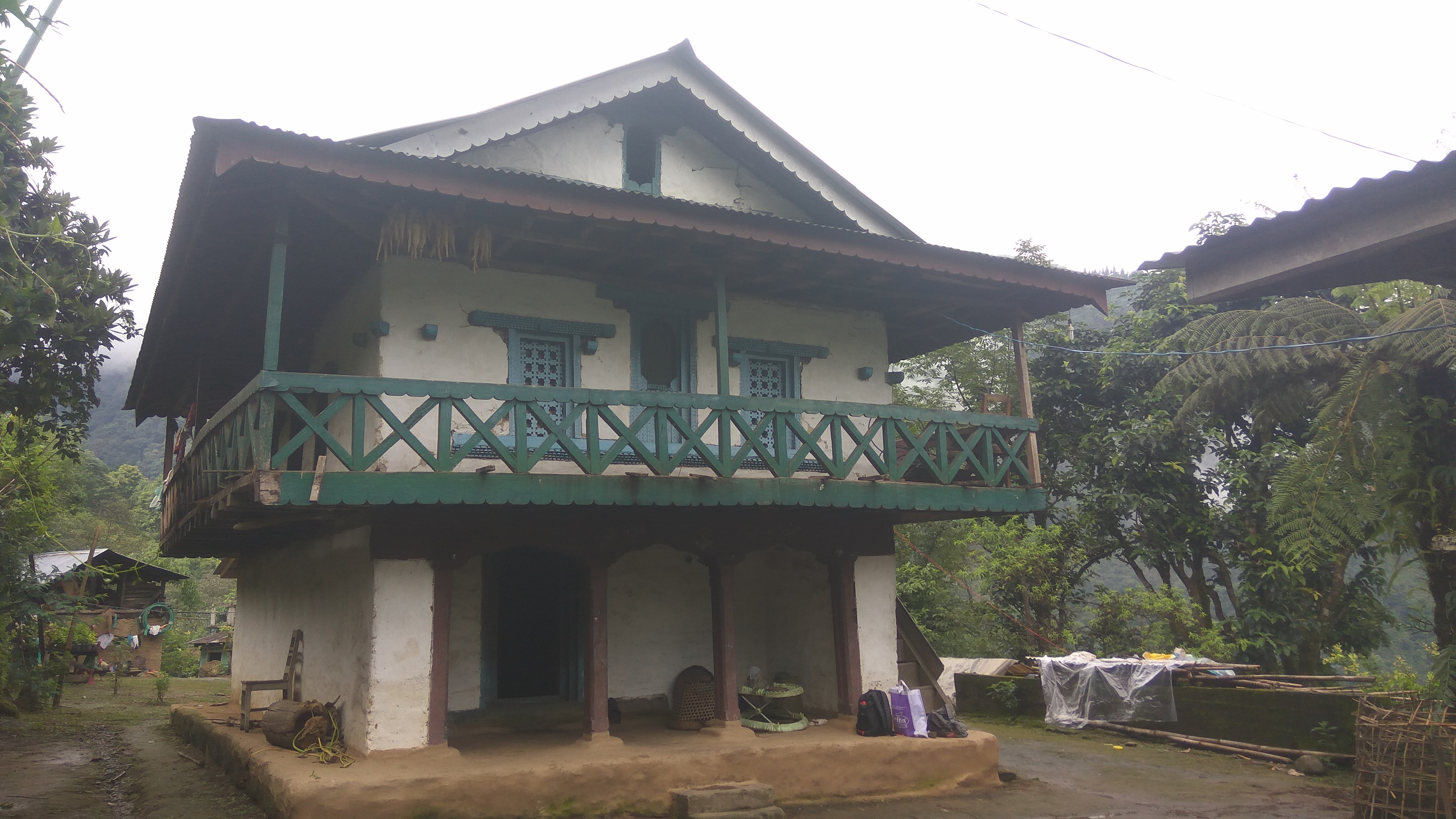
Limboo house in Hee- kengbari village in West Sikkim, Sikkim, India

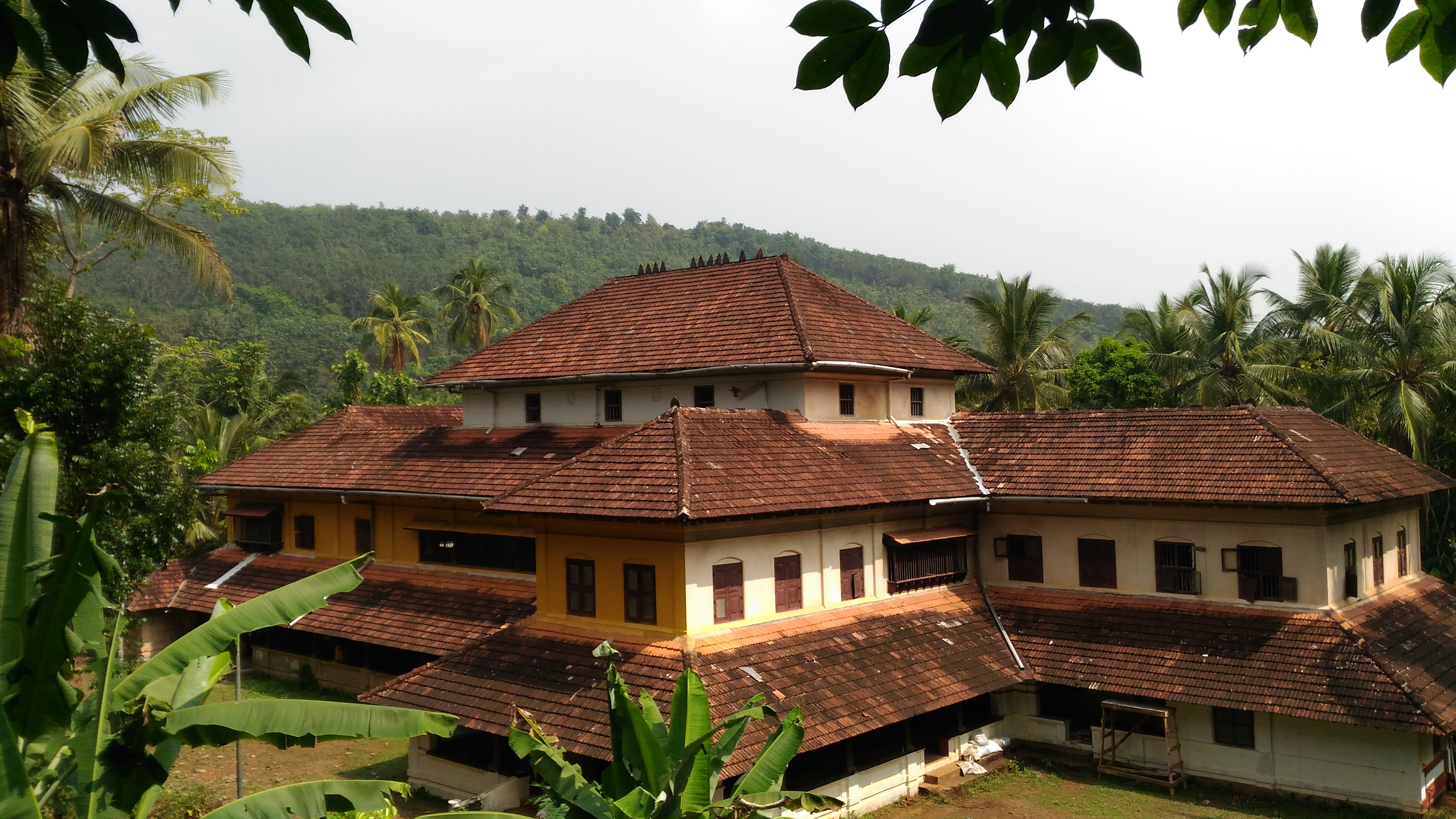
Traditional Nālukettu (ancestral home) from Kerala

=== East Asia ===
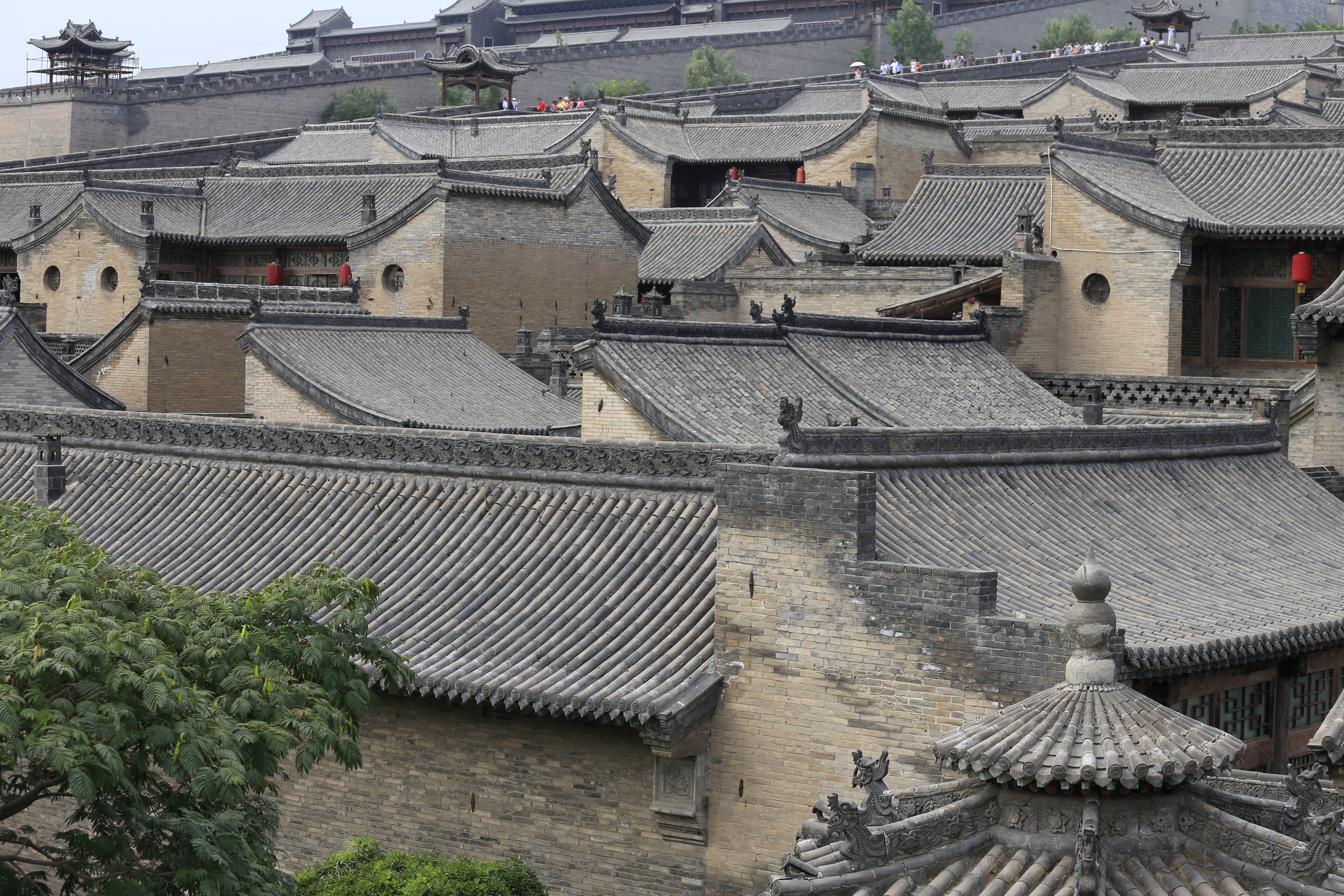
Wang Family Compound in Lingshi, Shanxi

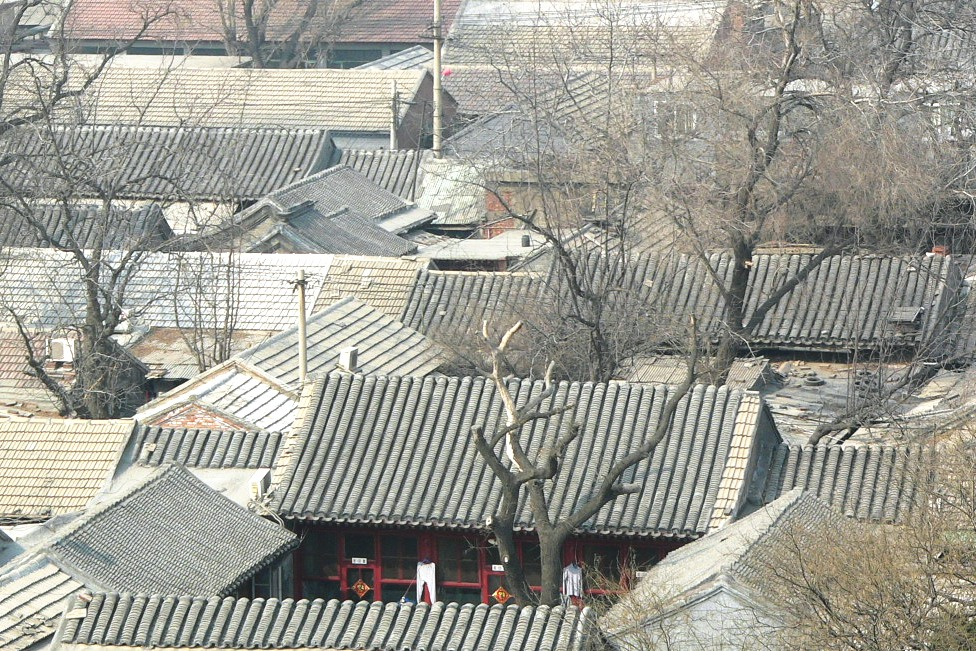
Siheyuan in Beijing

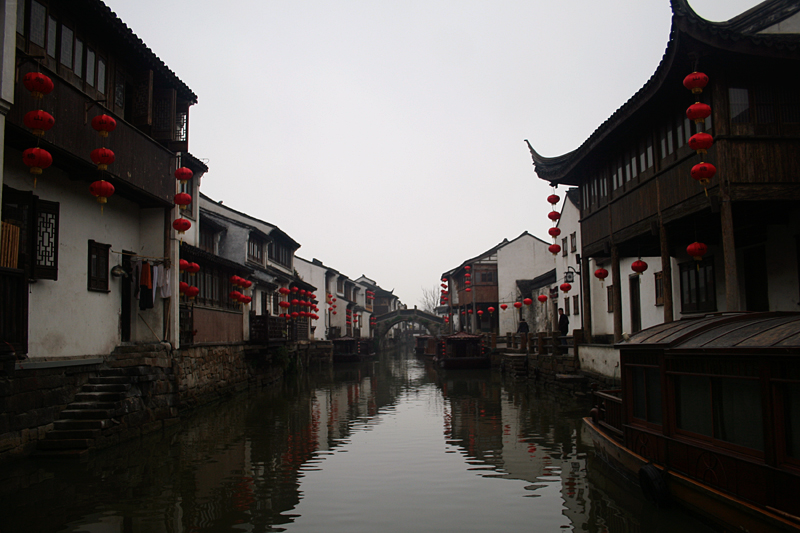
Downtown in Suzhou

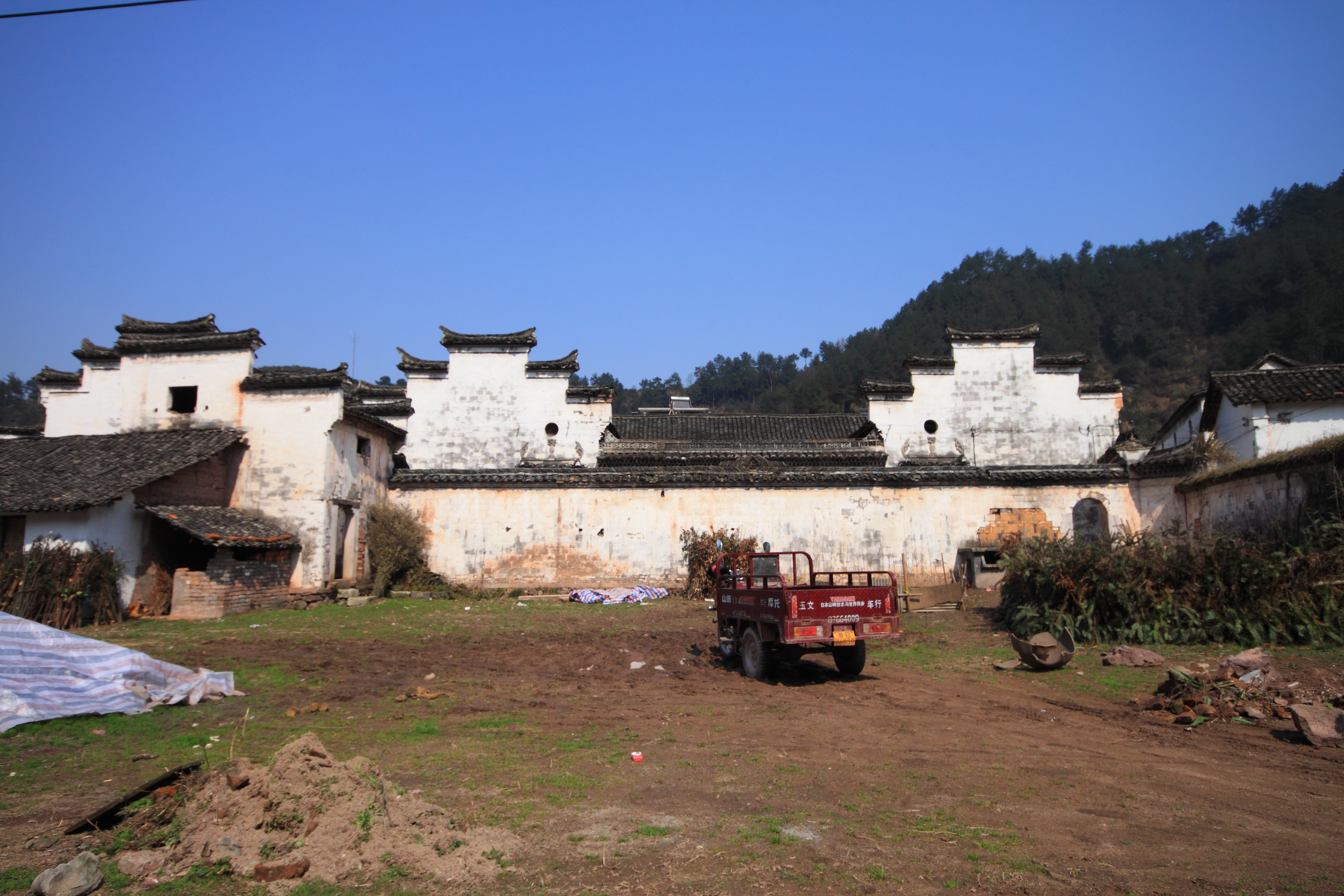
Mansion in Zhejiang

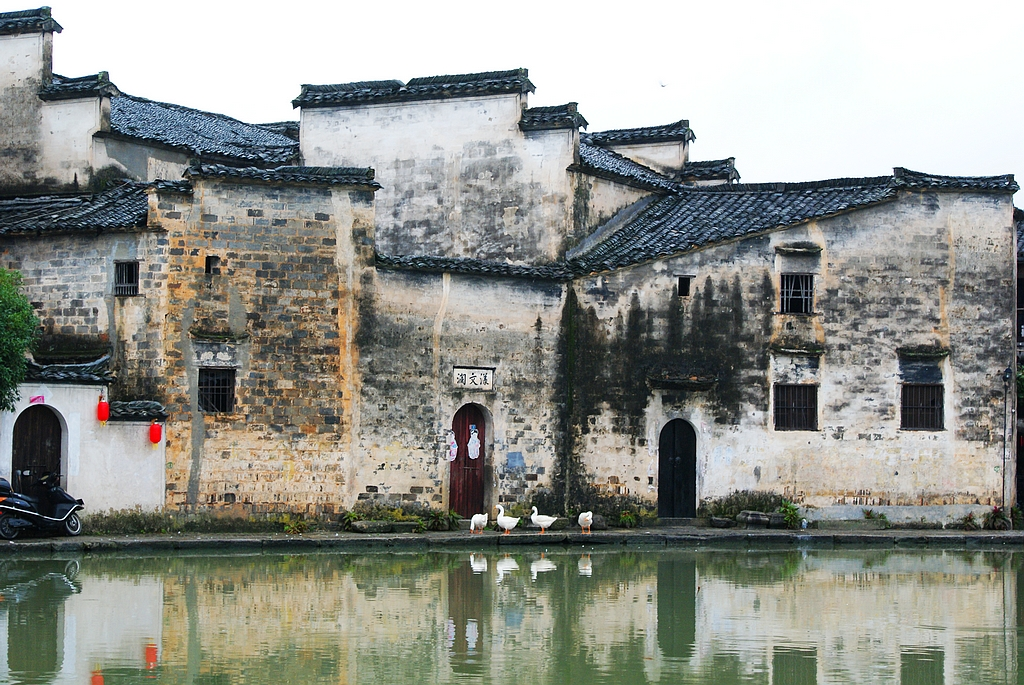
Hongcun in Anhui

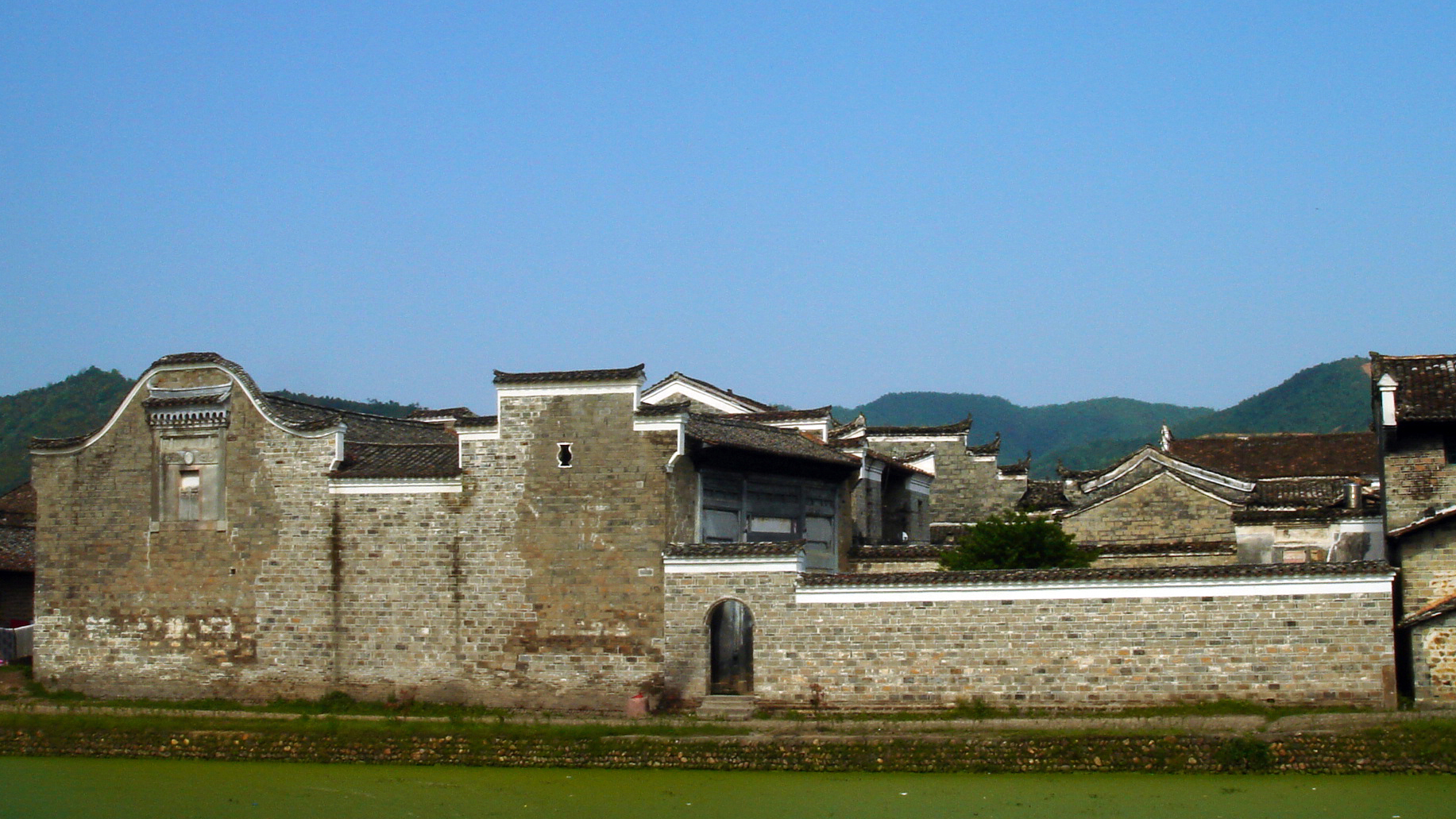
Village in Jiangxi

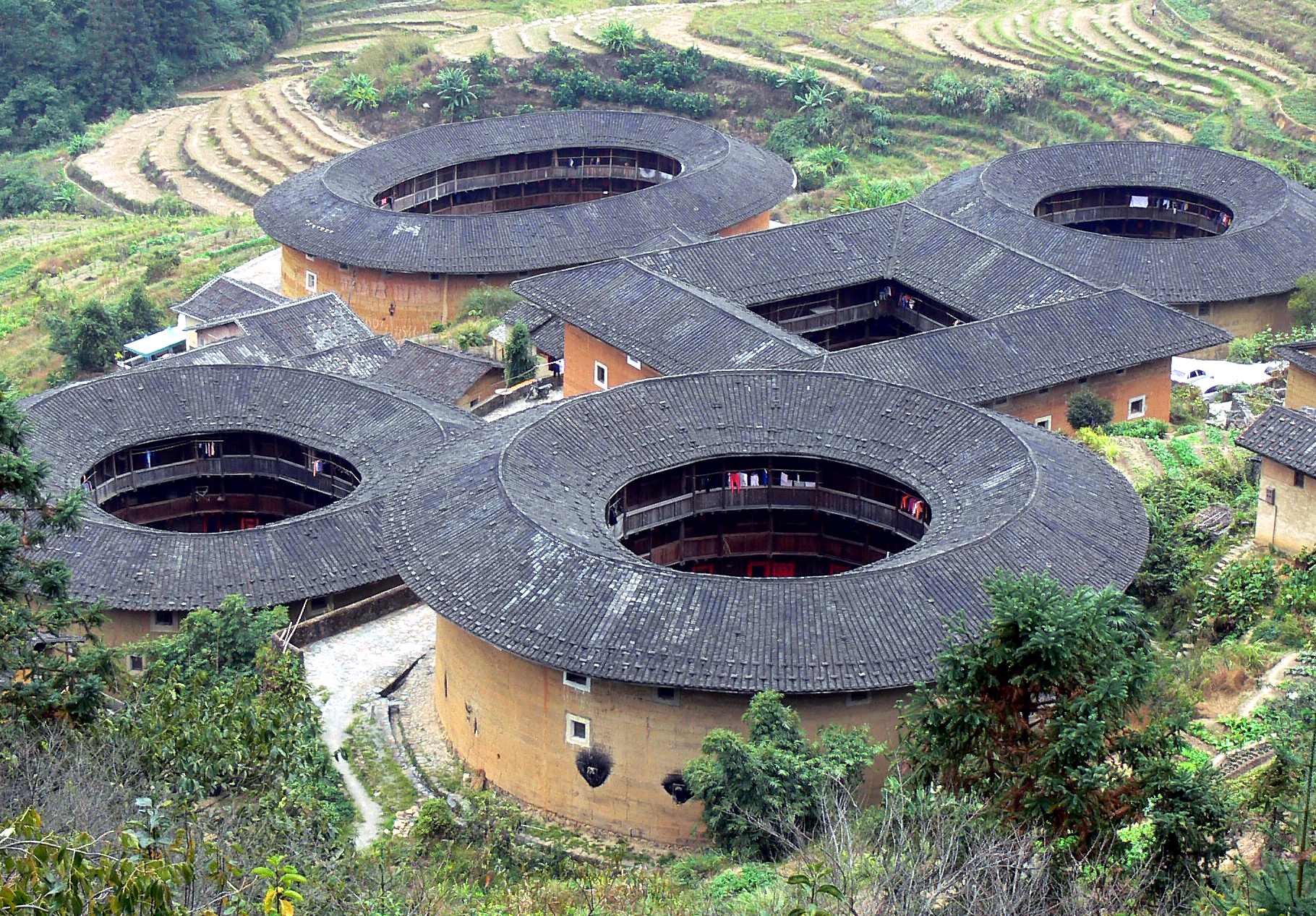
Fujian Tulou

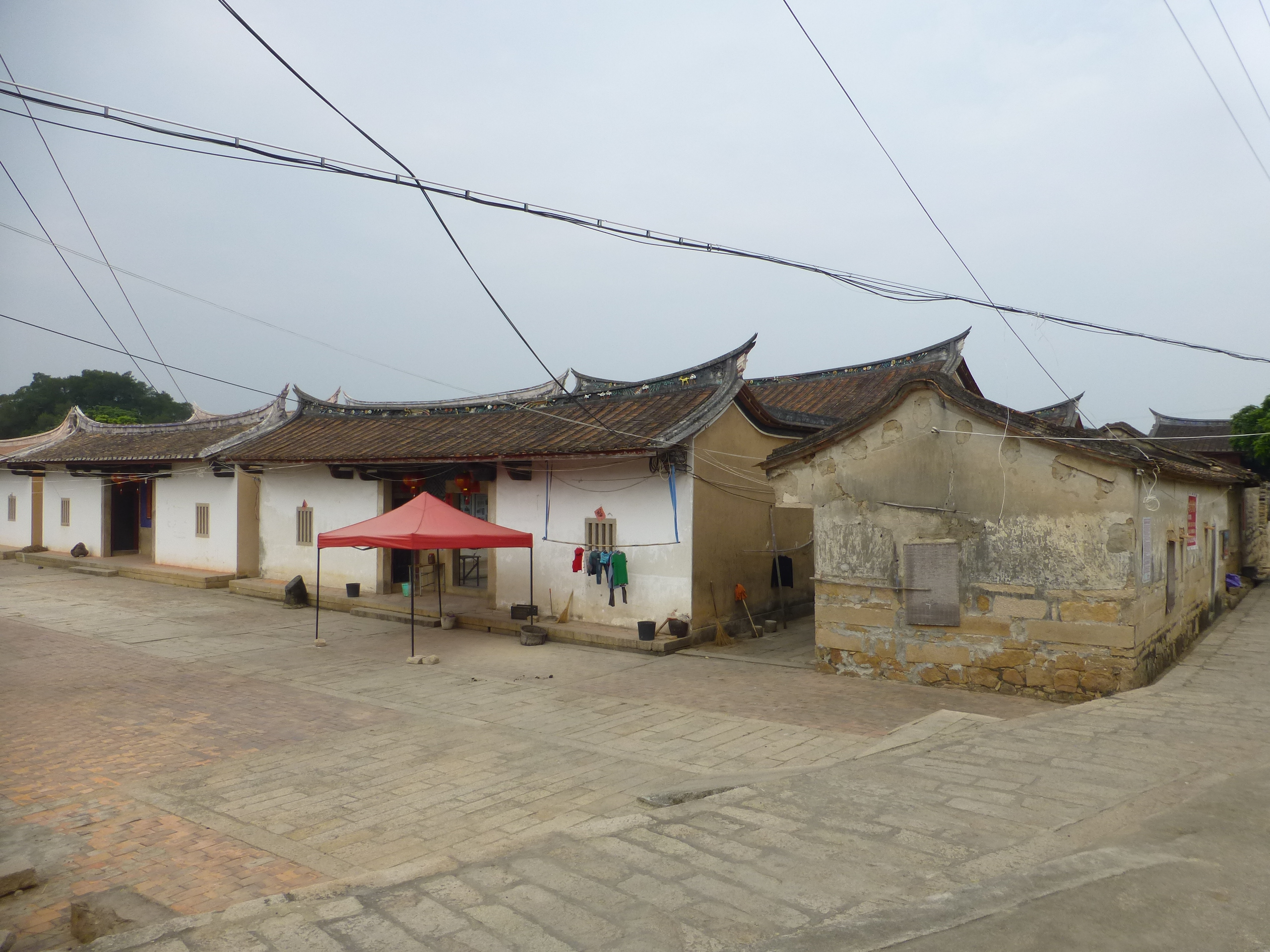
Traditional house in Fujian

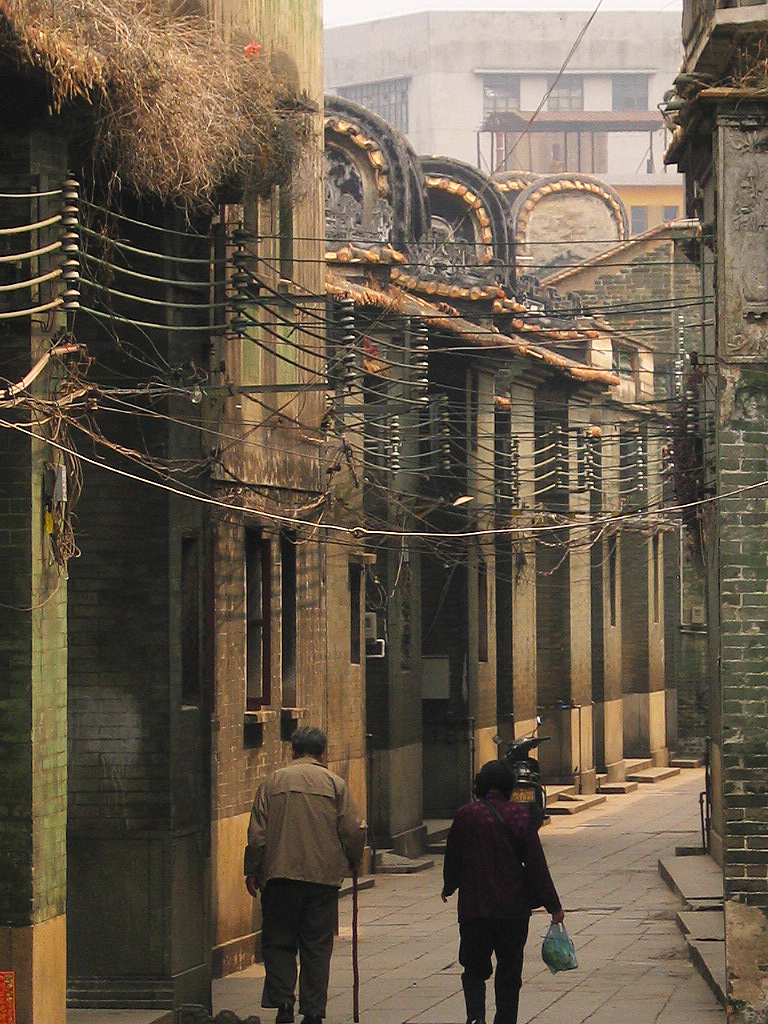
Lane in Guangdong

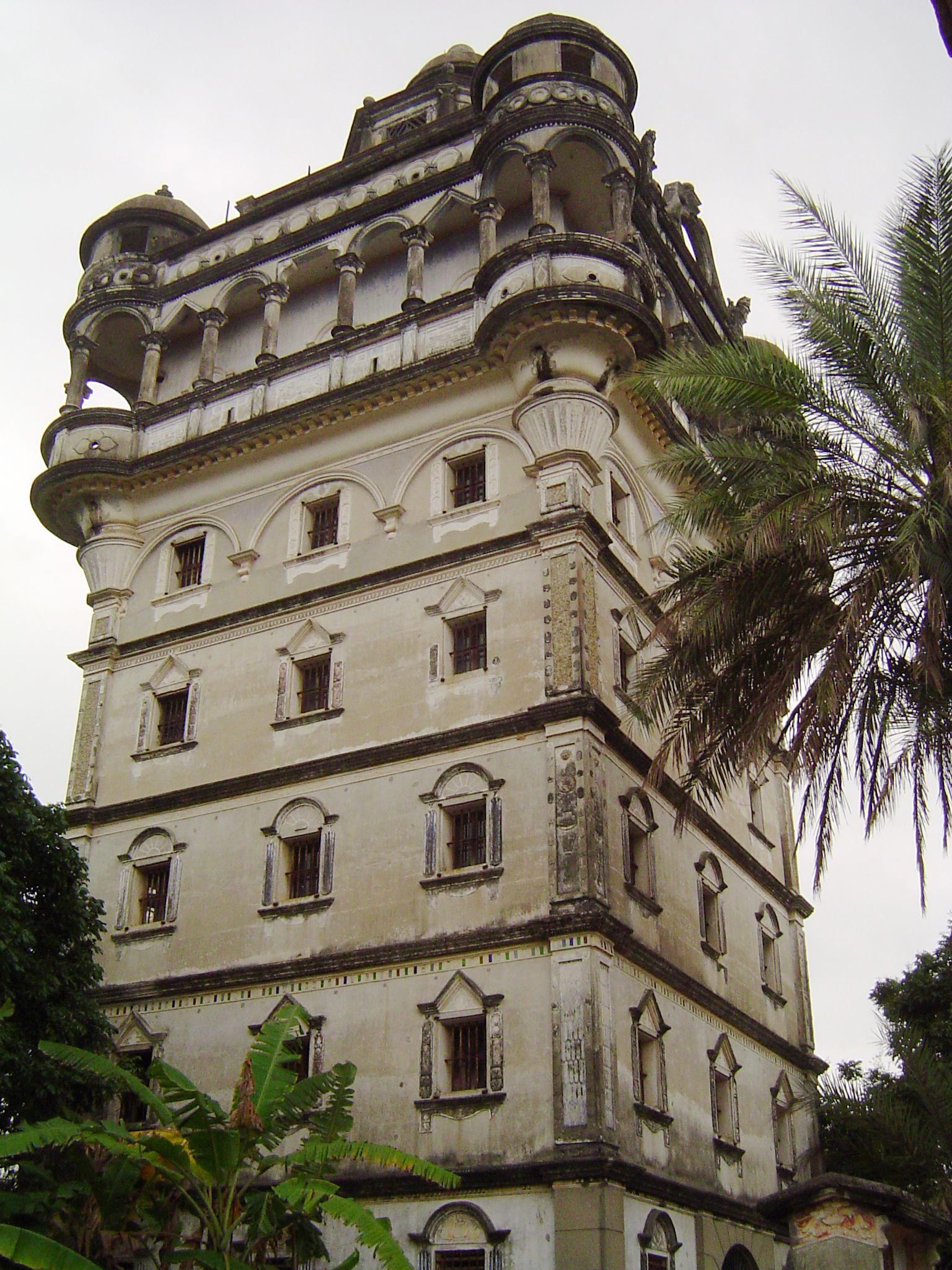
Kaiping Diaolou

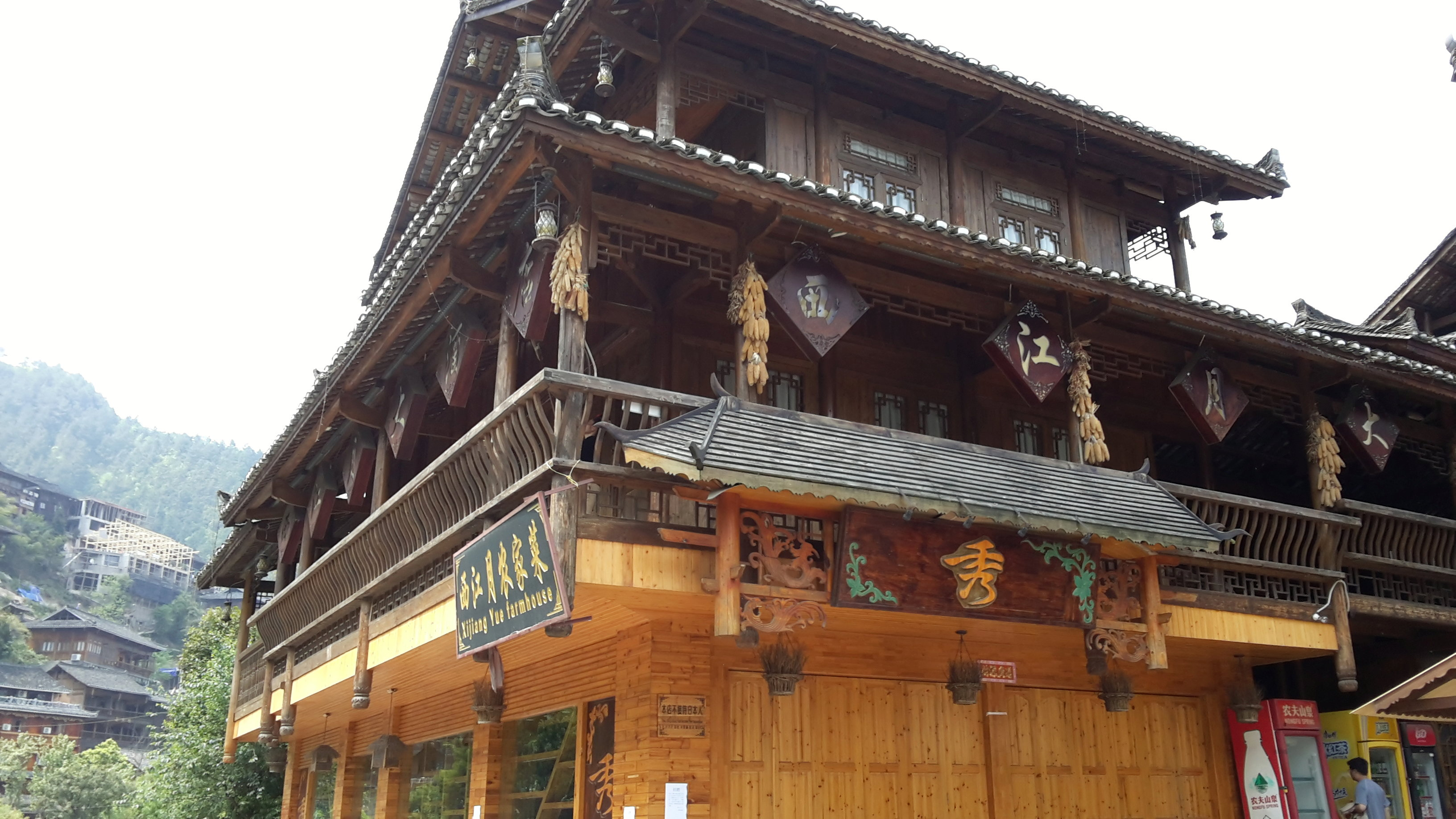
Miao people house in Guizhou

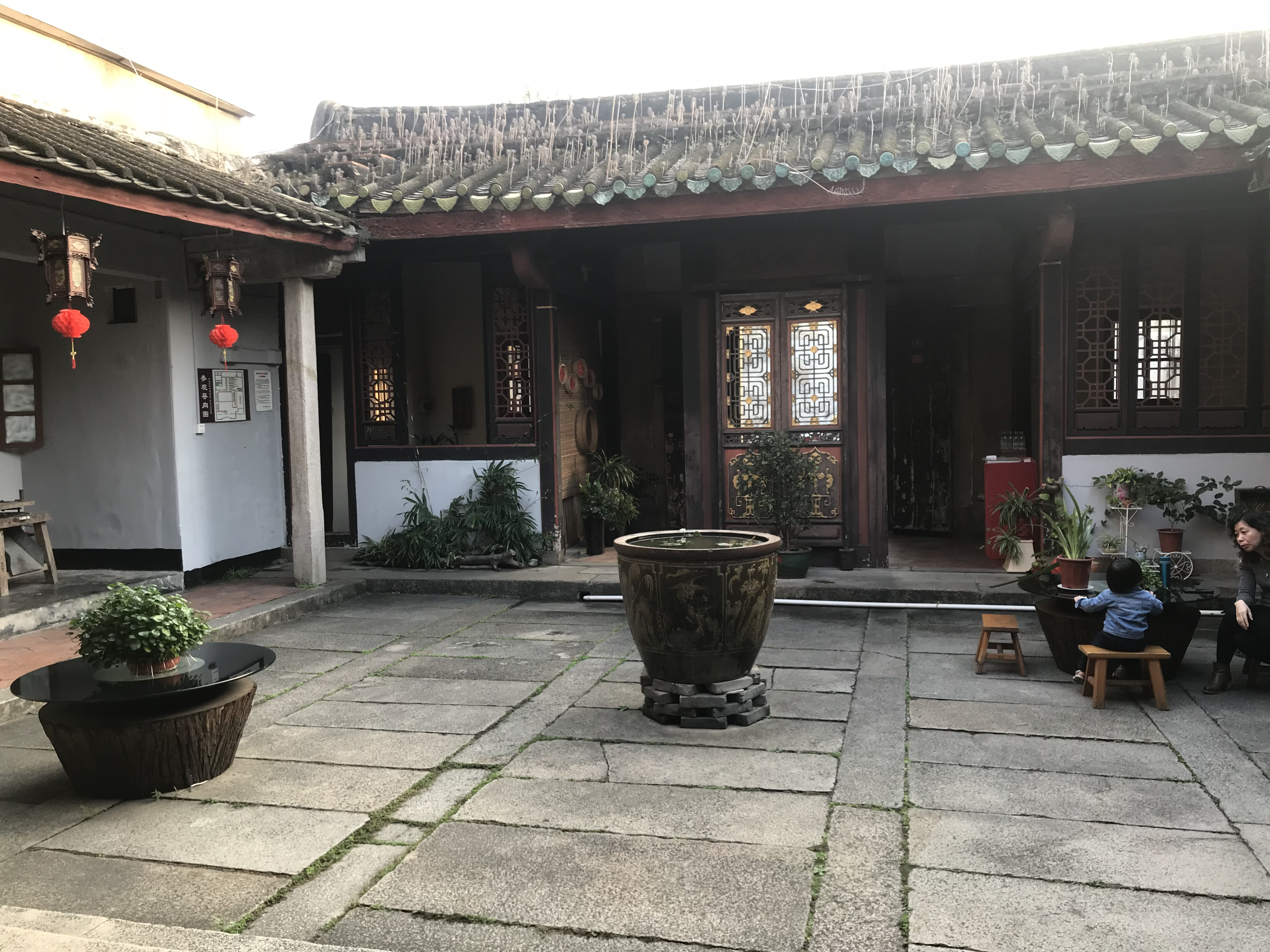
Han Teochew dwelling in Guangdong

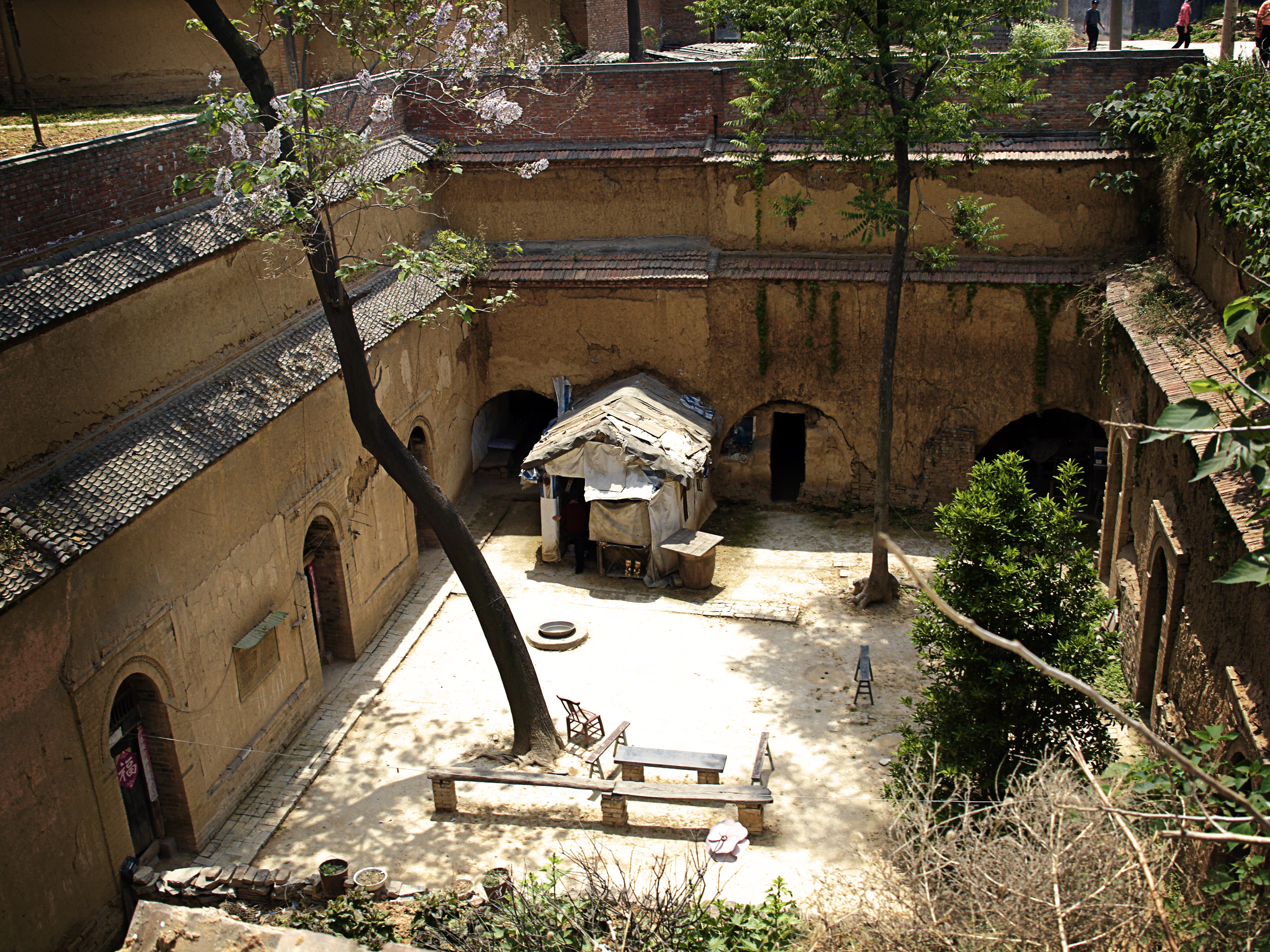
Yaodong or cave dwelling in Shaanxi

=== Mainland Southeast Asia ===
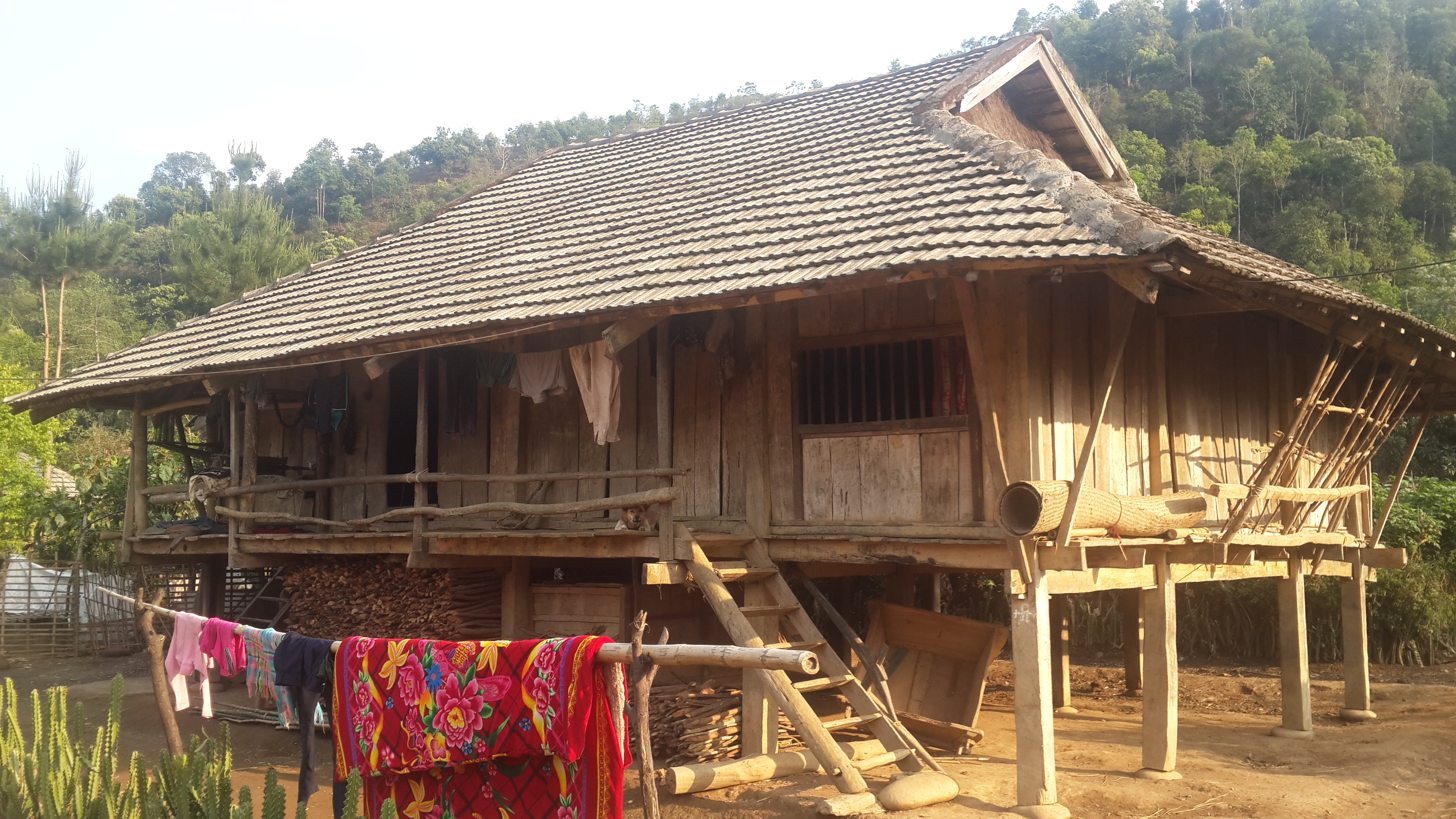
Stilt house of Lao people in Lai Châu

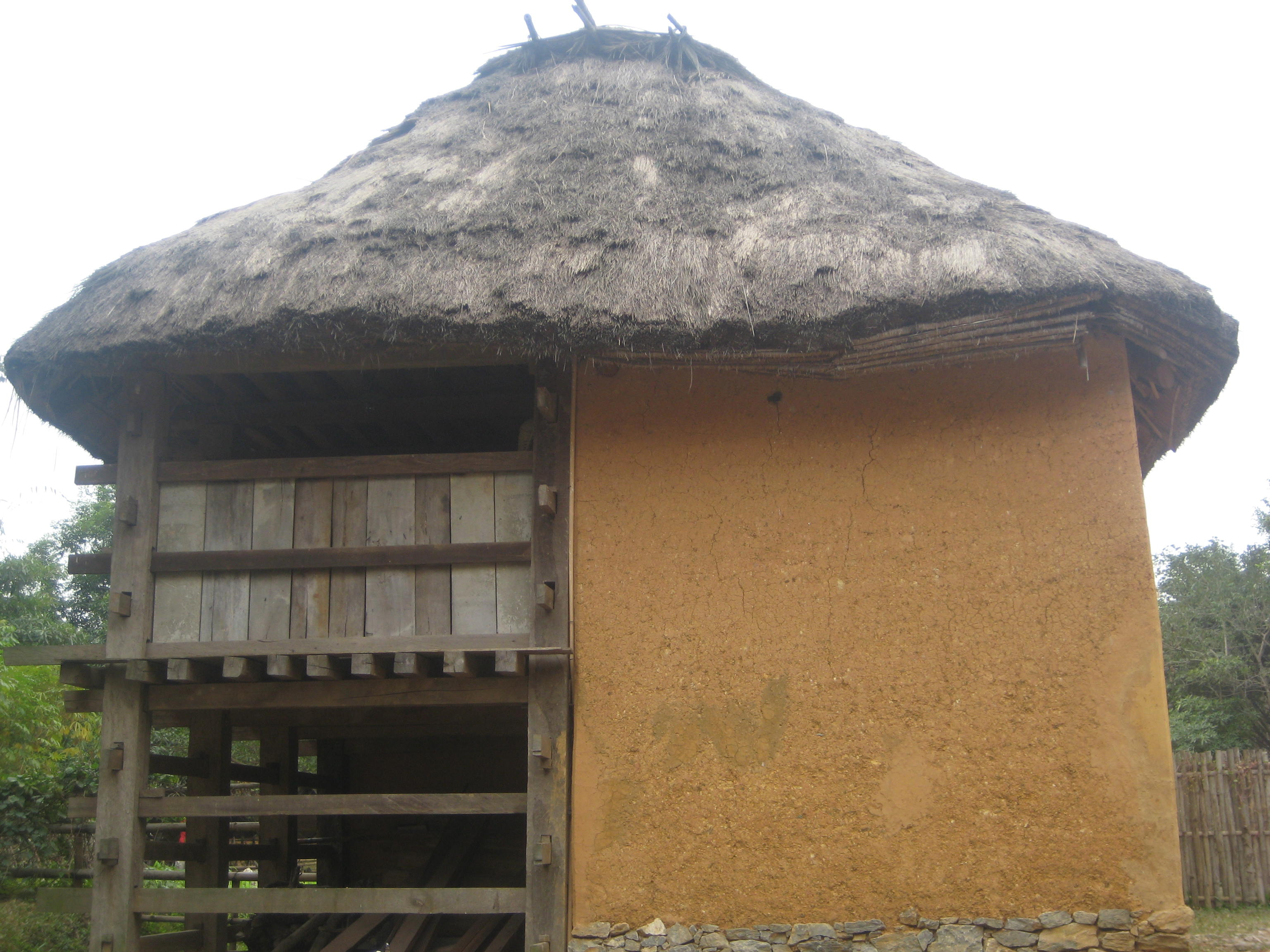
A Hani people house in northern Vietnam

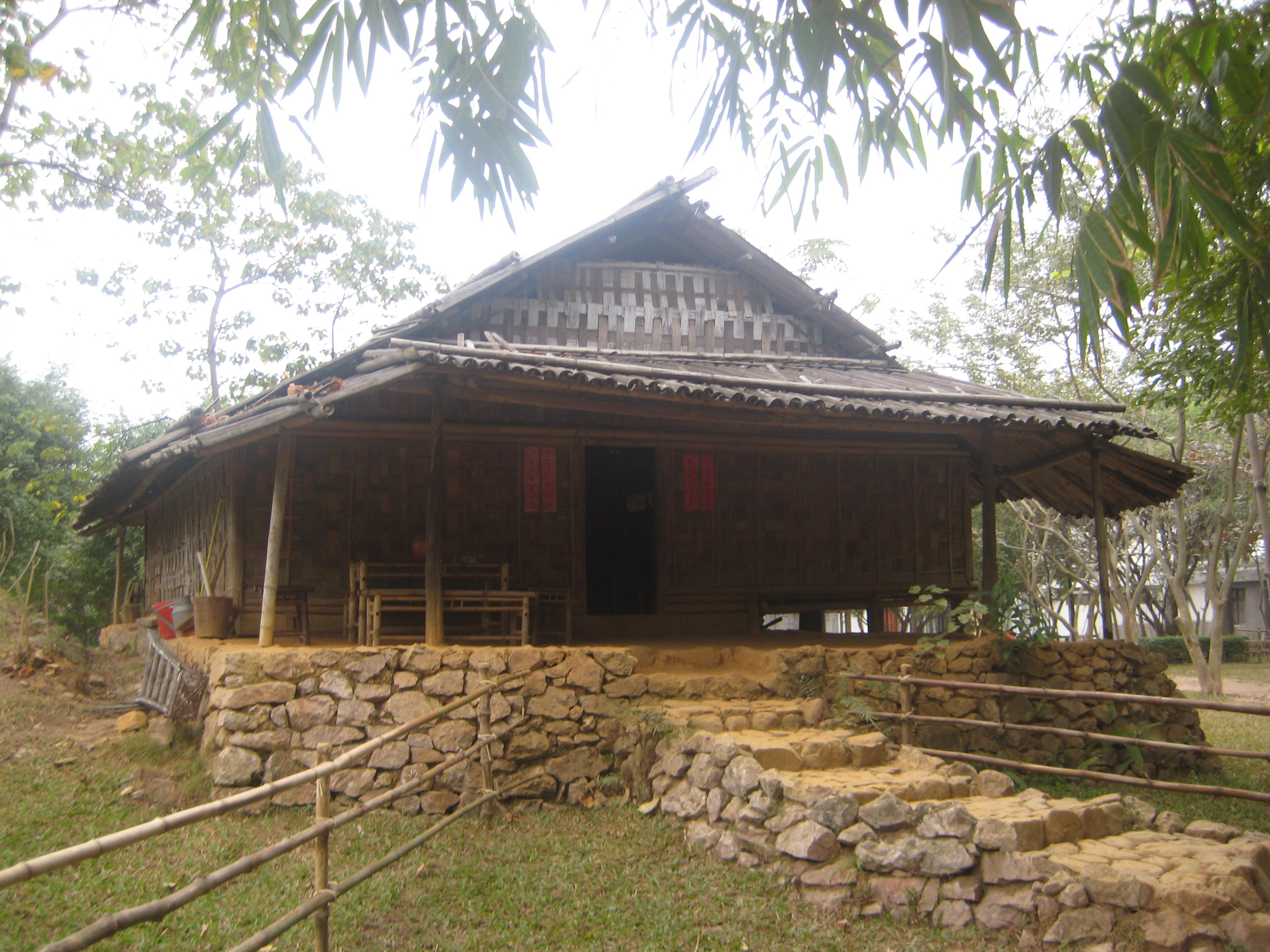
A Yao people house in Vietnam

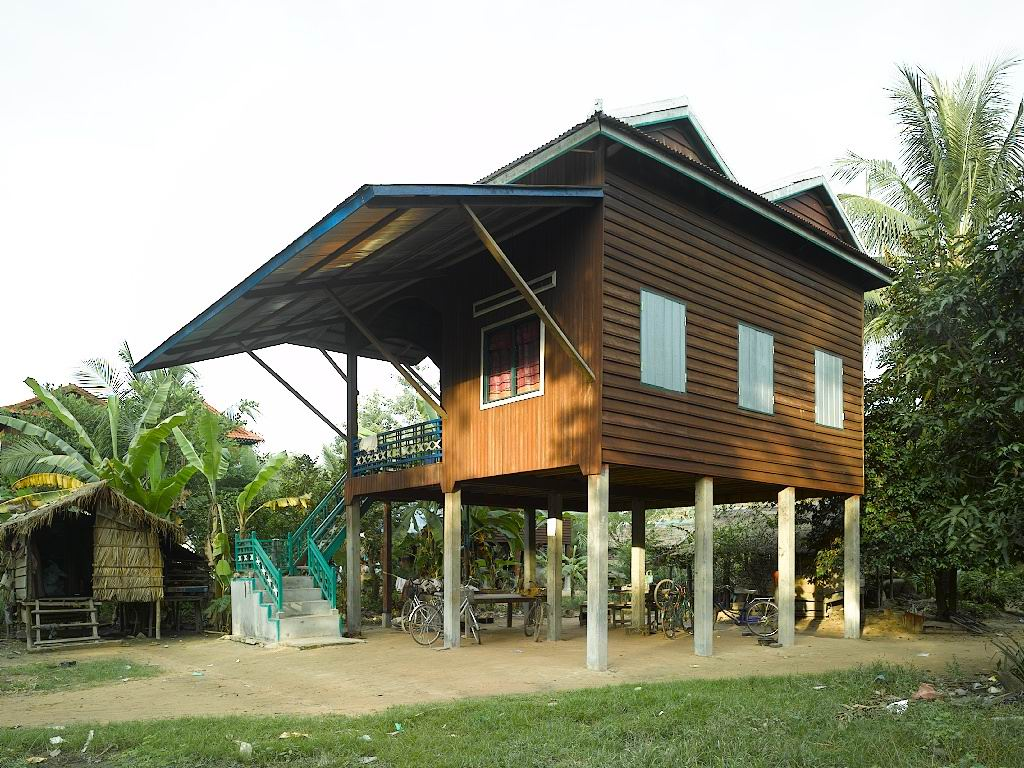
A typical Khmer stilt house

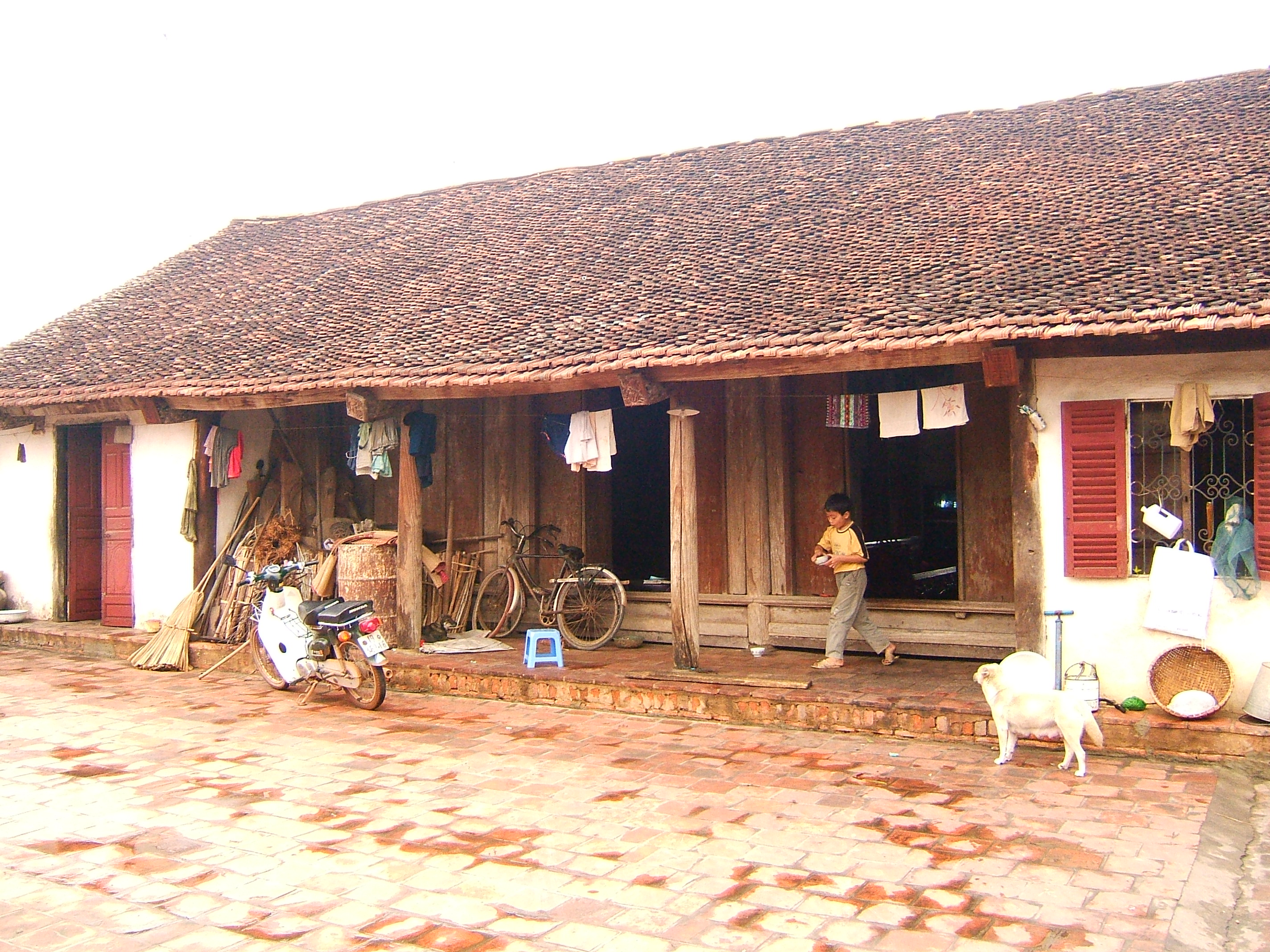
A traditional Vietnamese house in Red River Delta region

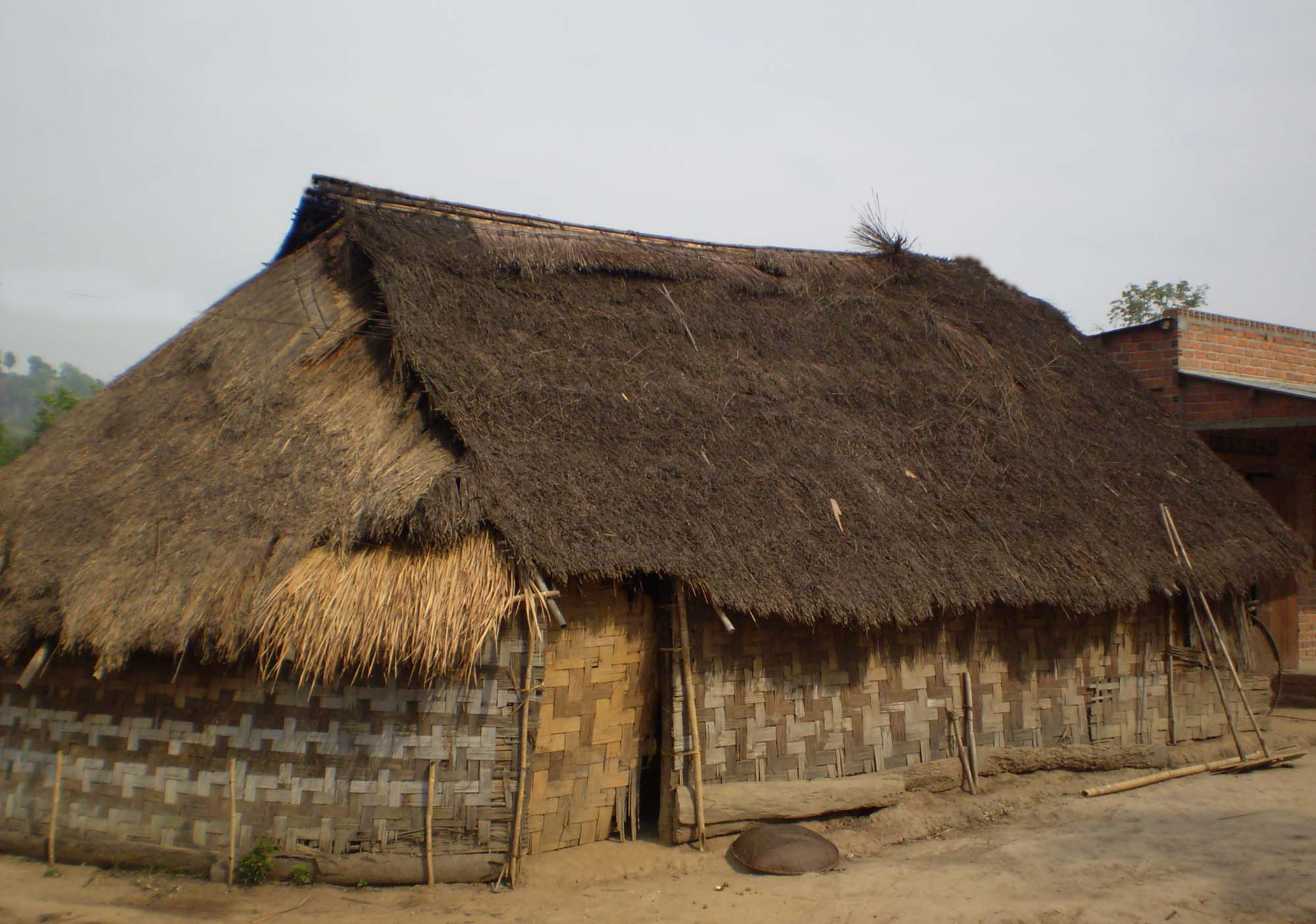
A Mnong people hut in southern Vietnam

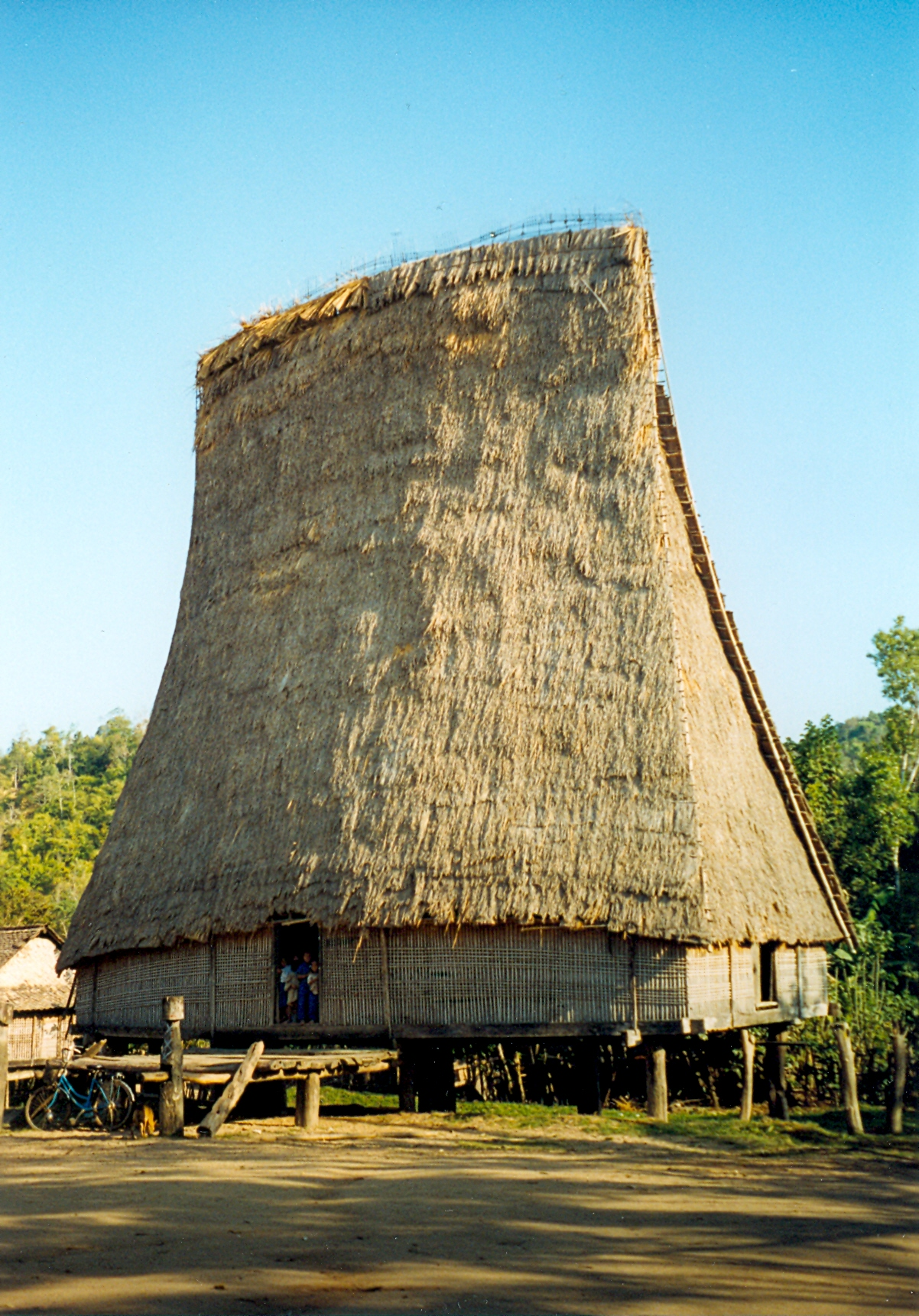
A "rong" house of the Bahnar people of Vietnam

=== Island Southeast Asia and Austronesia ===
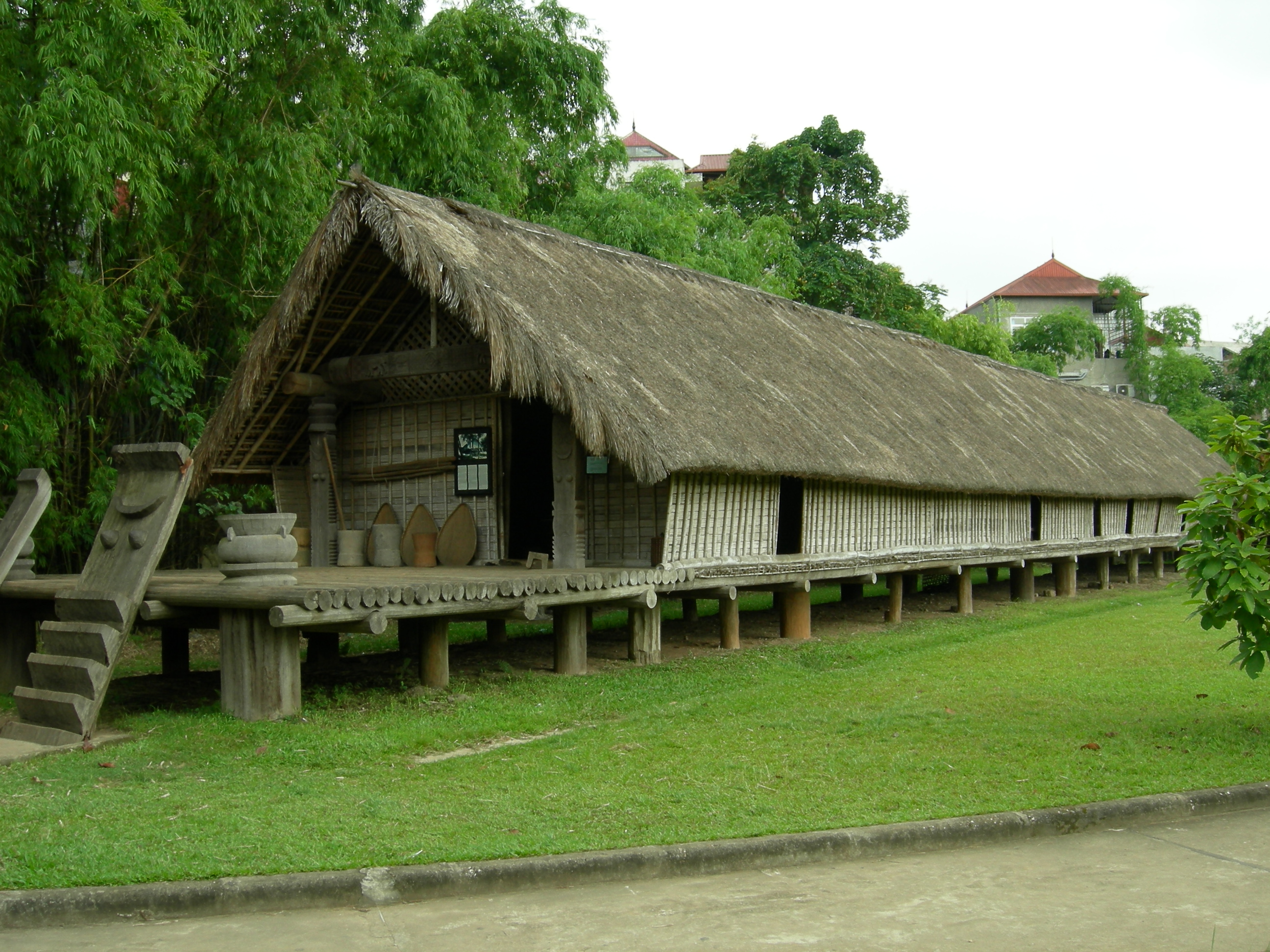
Long communal house of the Rhade people

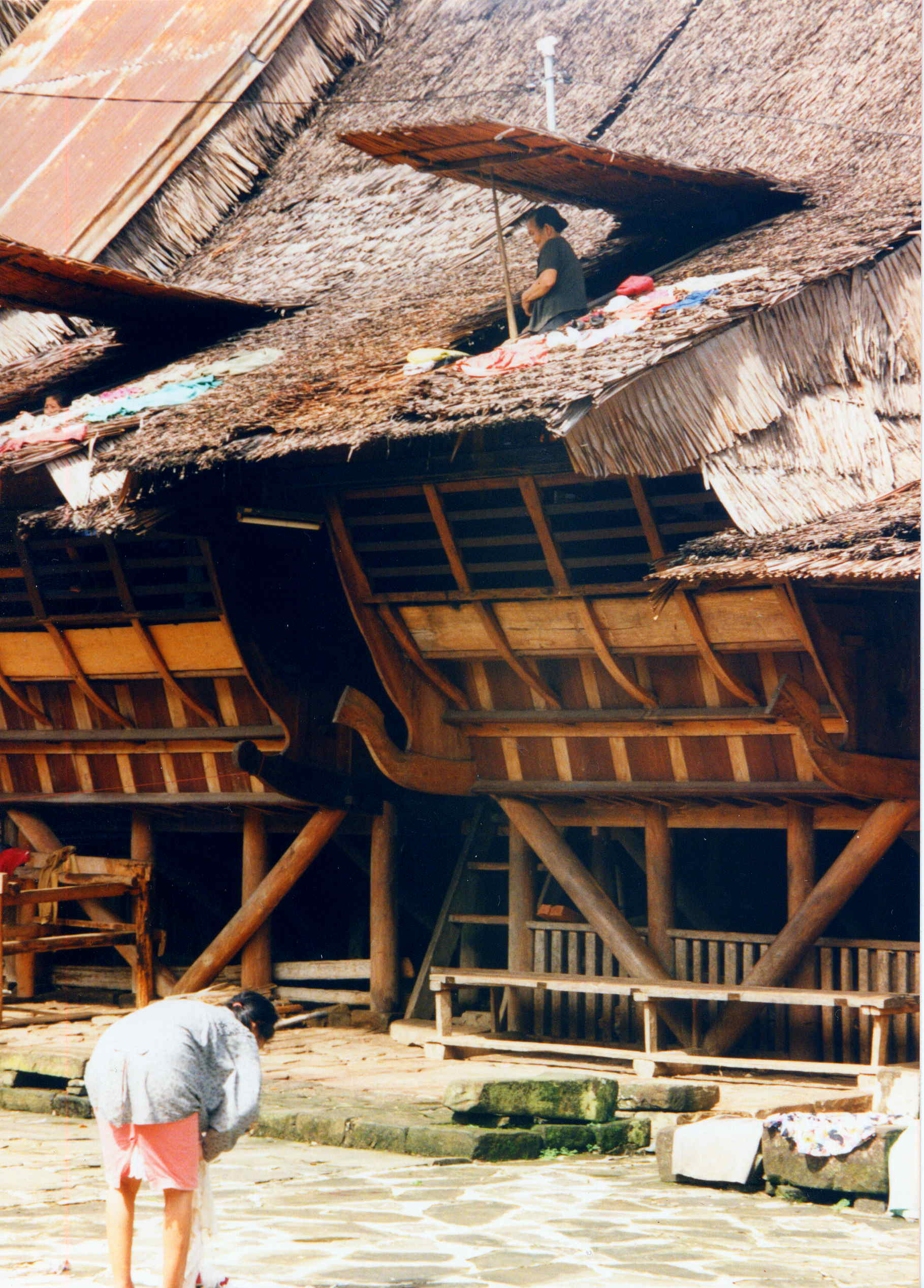
A traditional house, Nias Island, North Sumatra, Indonesia

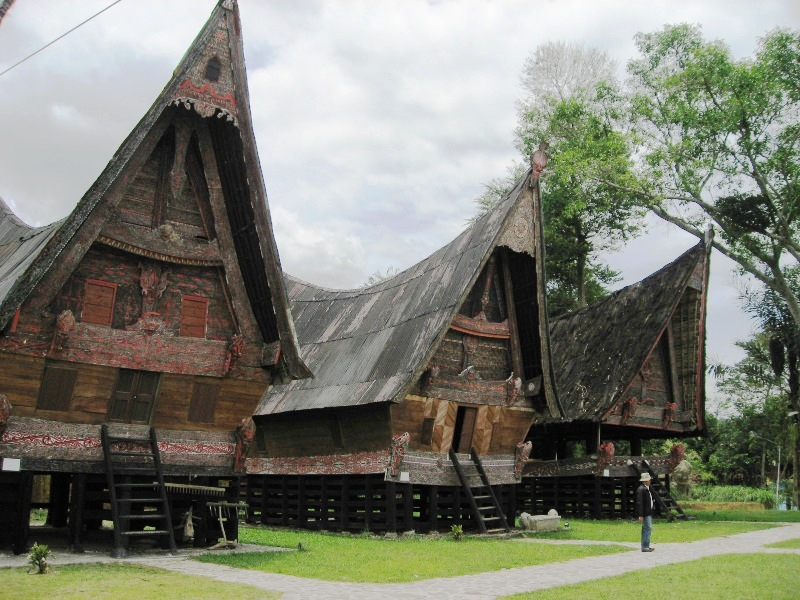
Toba traditional house, Indonesia

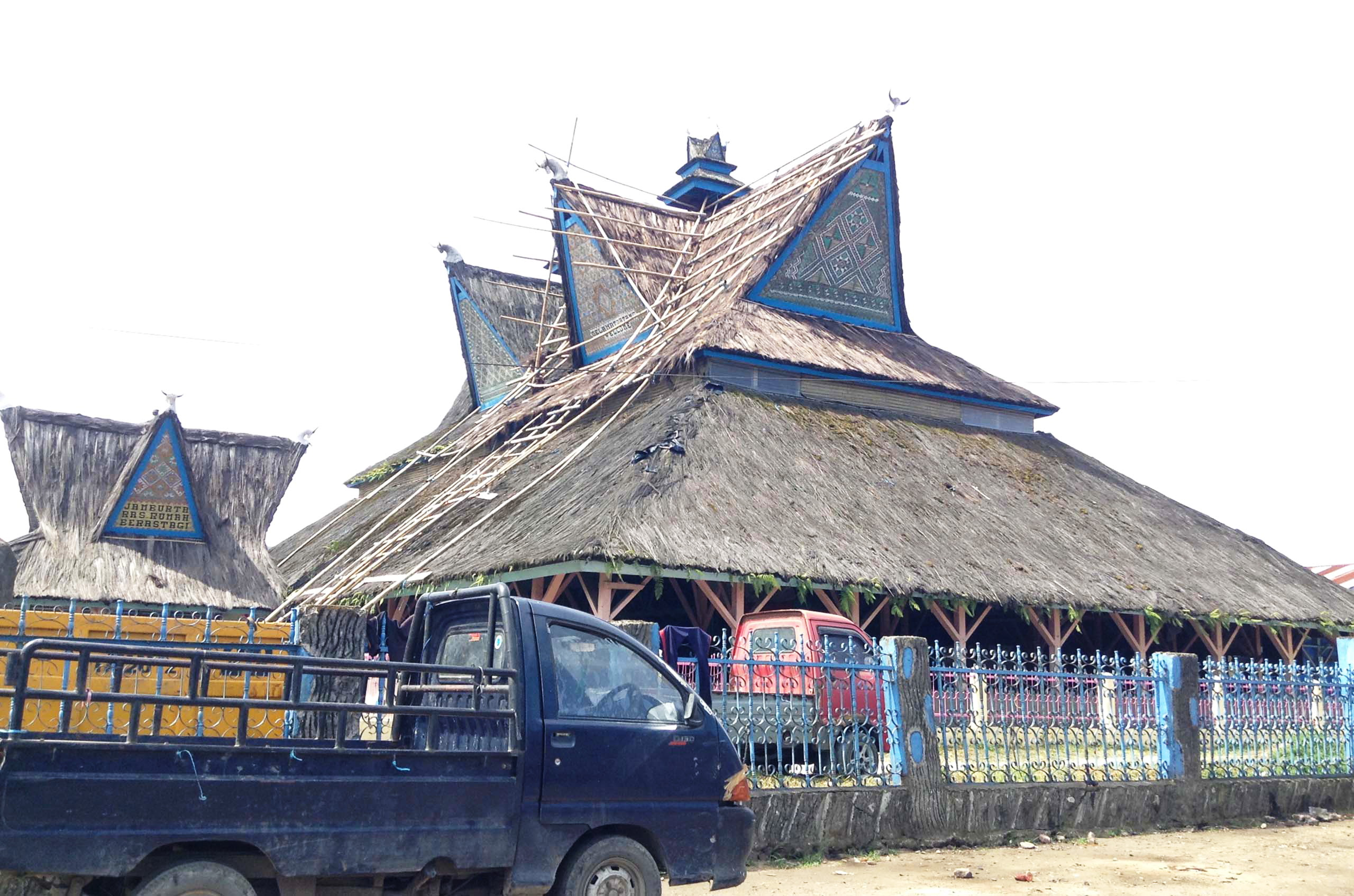
The house of the chief of a village in Kabanjahe shows the vernacular architecture of Karo people, Indonesia.

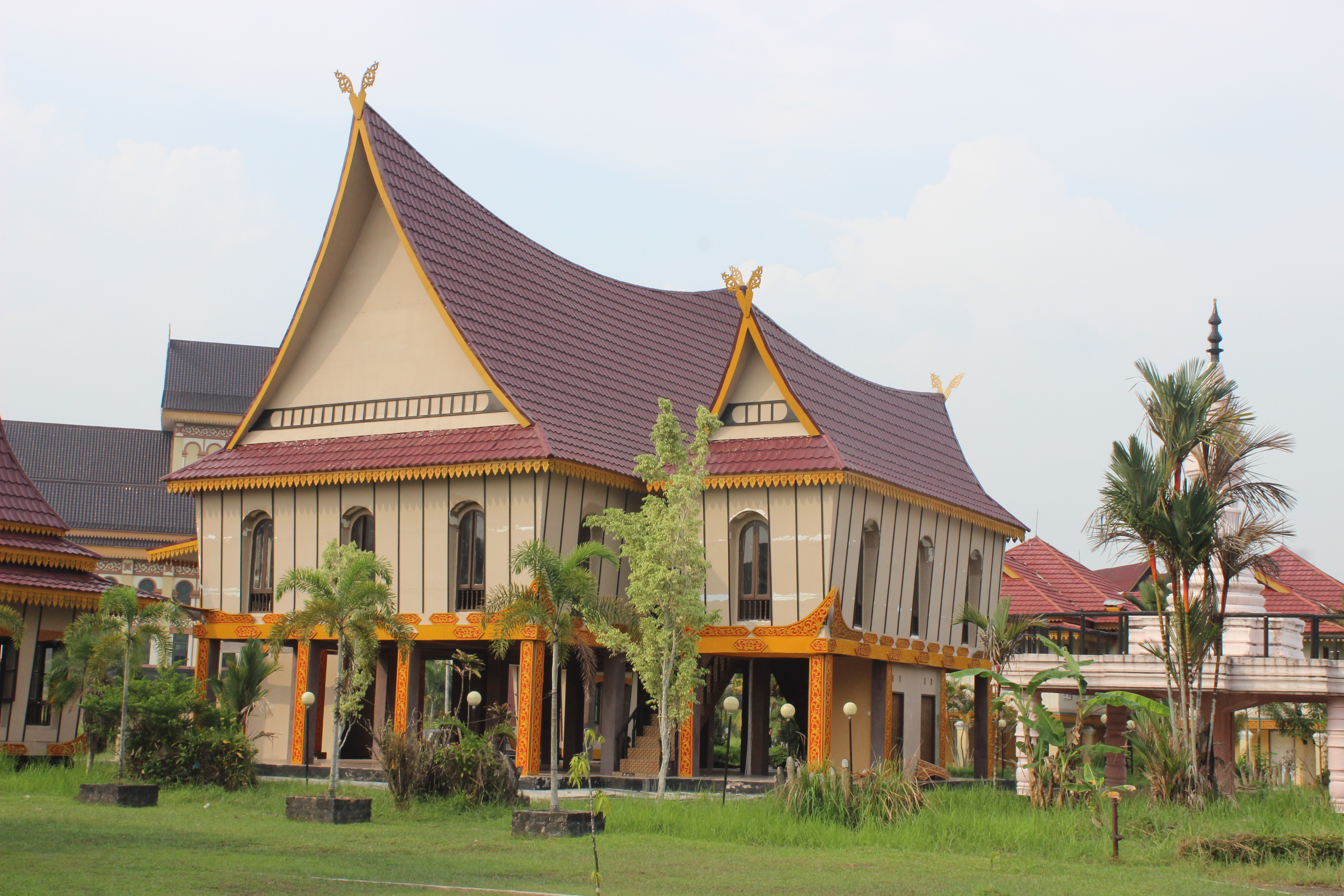
Rumah Lancang or Rumah Lontiok style, a traditional Malay Indonesians house from Riau, Sumatra, Indonesia

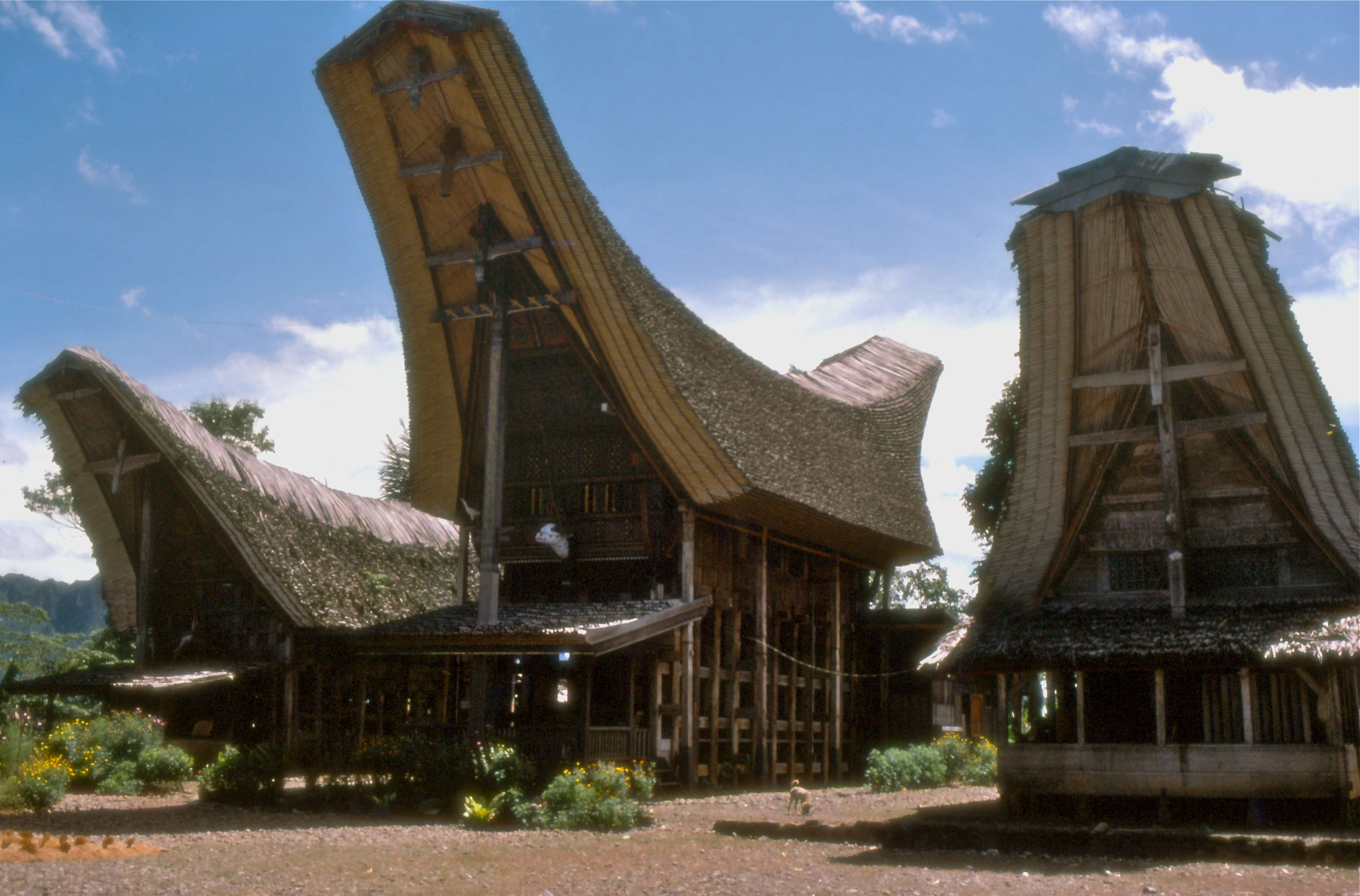
Tongkonan houses of the Toraja people, Sulawesi, Indonesia

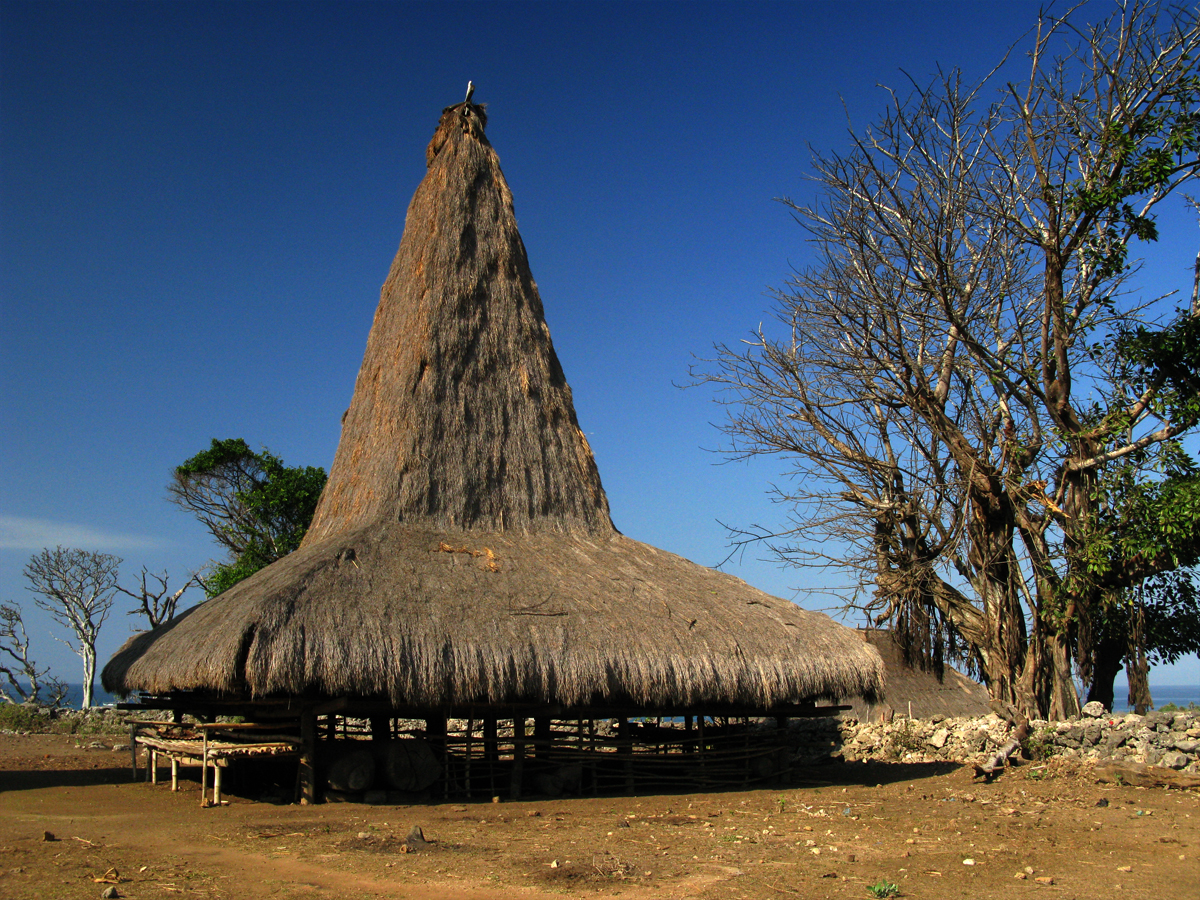
Sumba house, a traditional house, East Nusa Tenggara, Indonesia

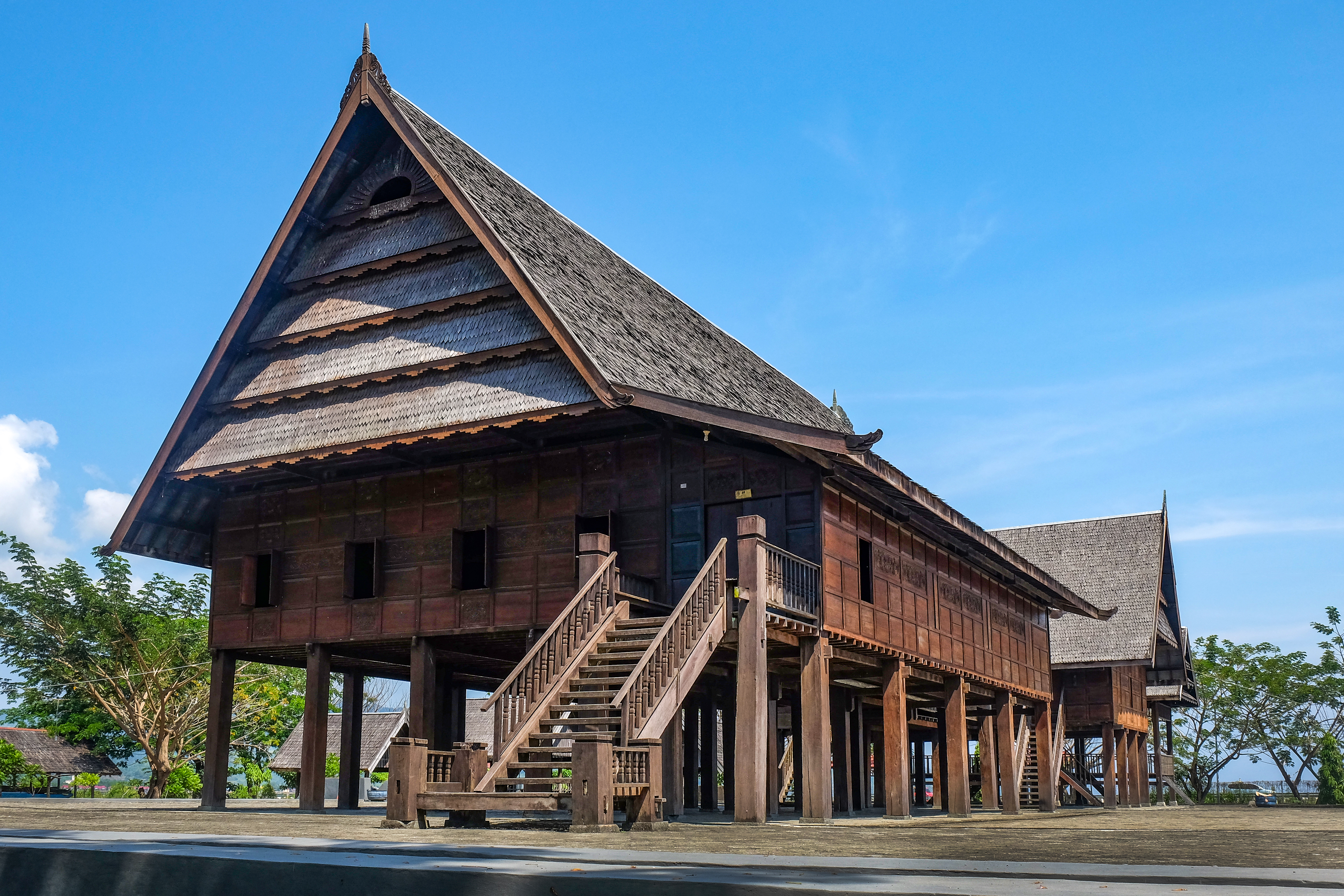
Mamuju house, a traditional house, West Sulawesi, Indonesia

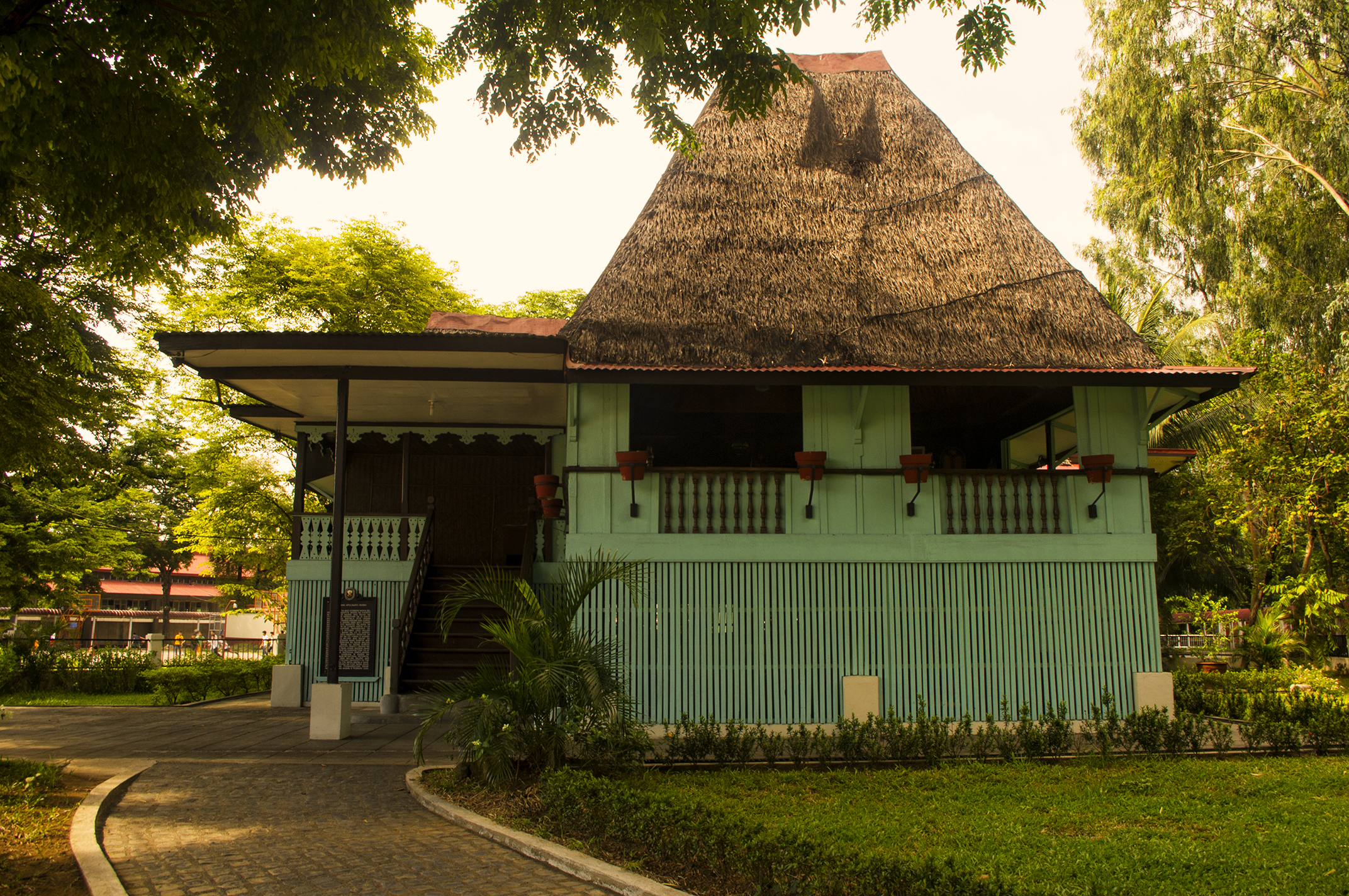
Bahay kubo, the traditional house of the Philippines

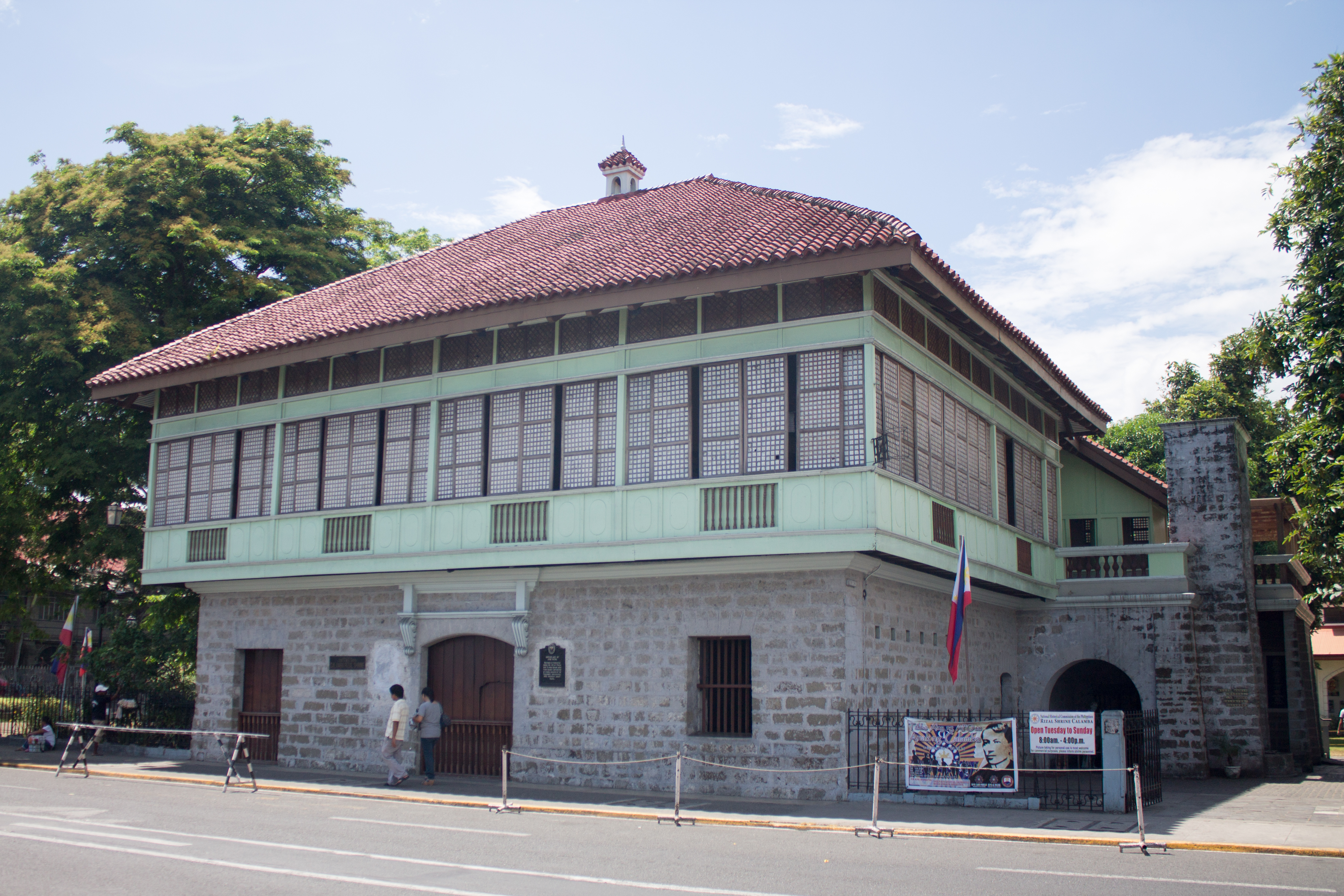
Bahay na bato of the Philippines

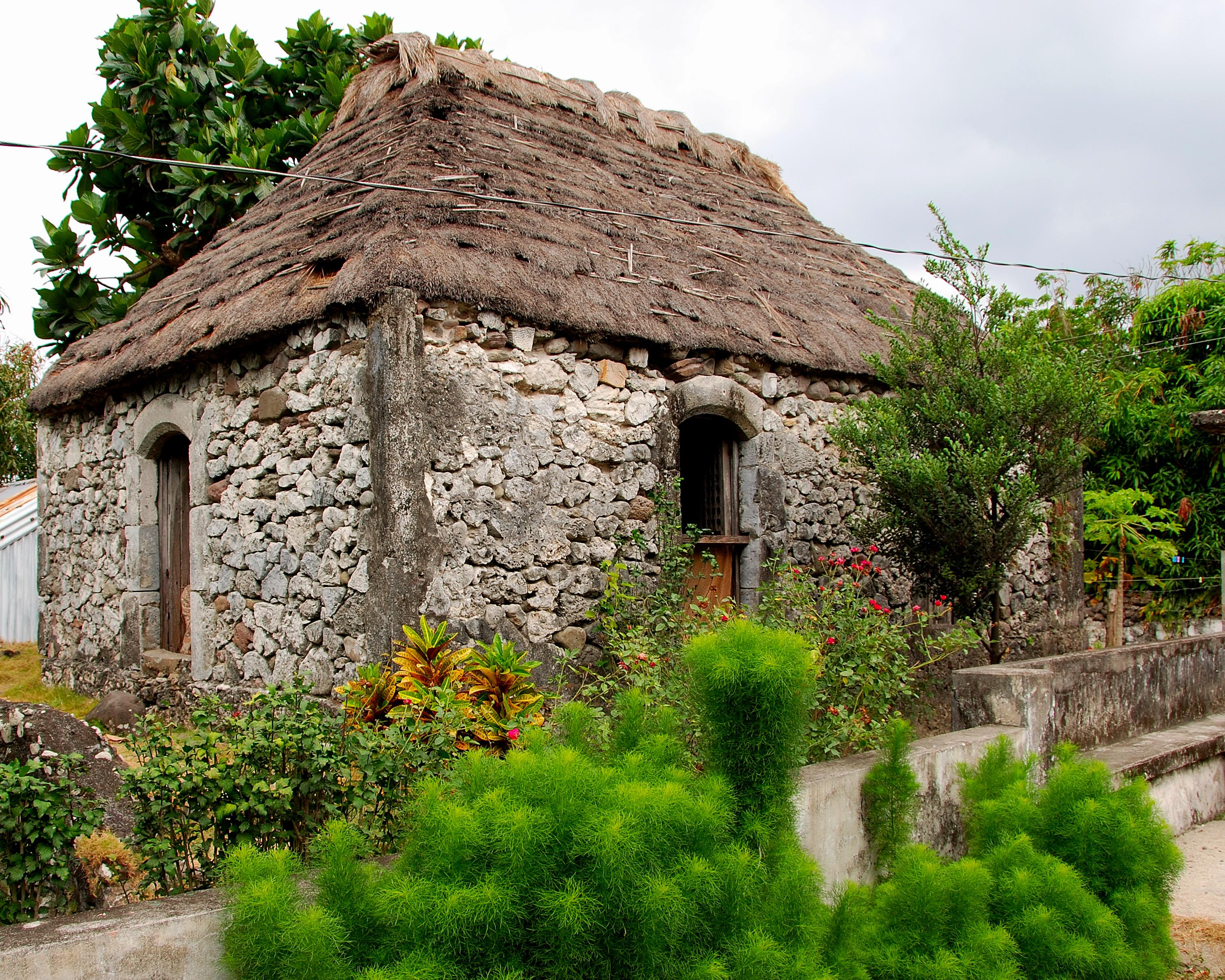
Stone house of the Ivatan people in Batanes, the Philippines

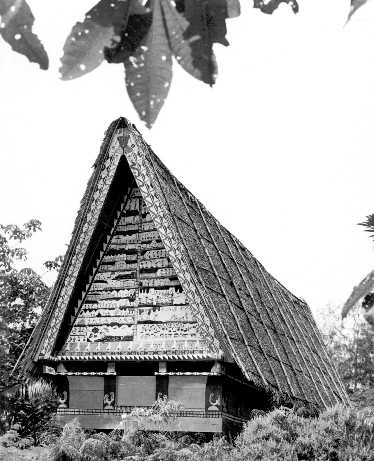
Bai meeting house of the Palauan people

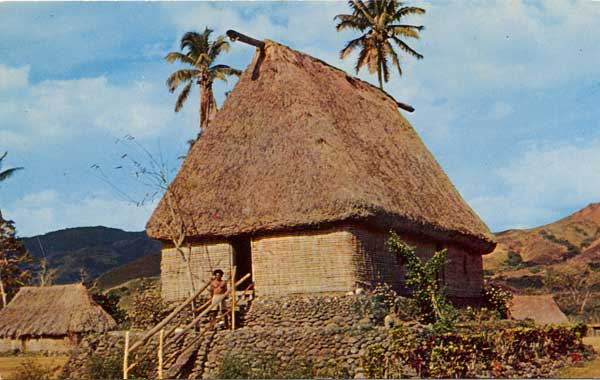
Bure of the Fijian people

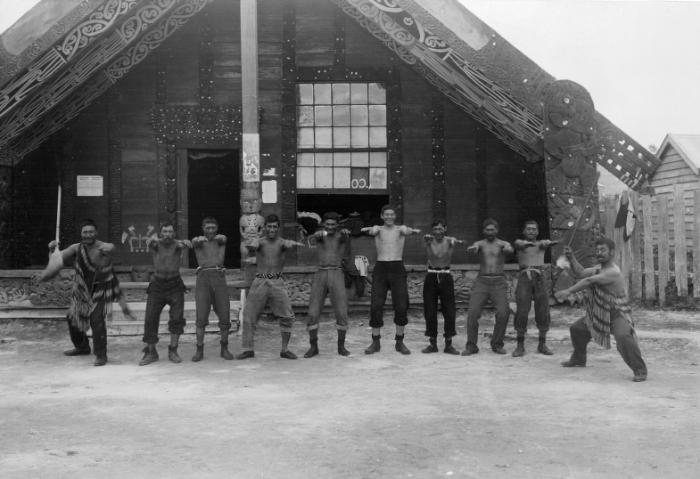
Wharenui Meeting House of the Māori people, Te Papaiouru Marae, New Zealand. 1908

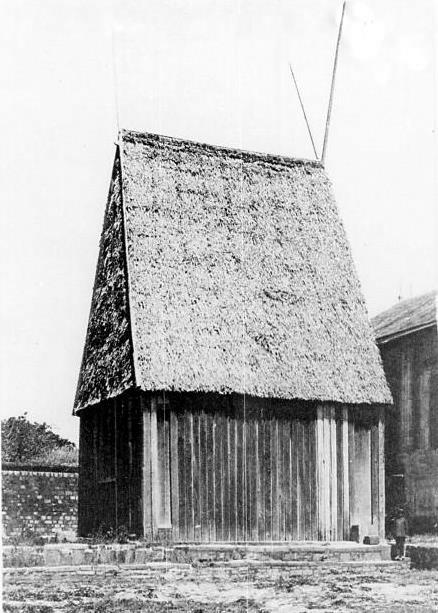
Besakana of the Merina people, Madagascar

=== Australia ===
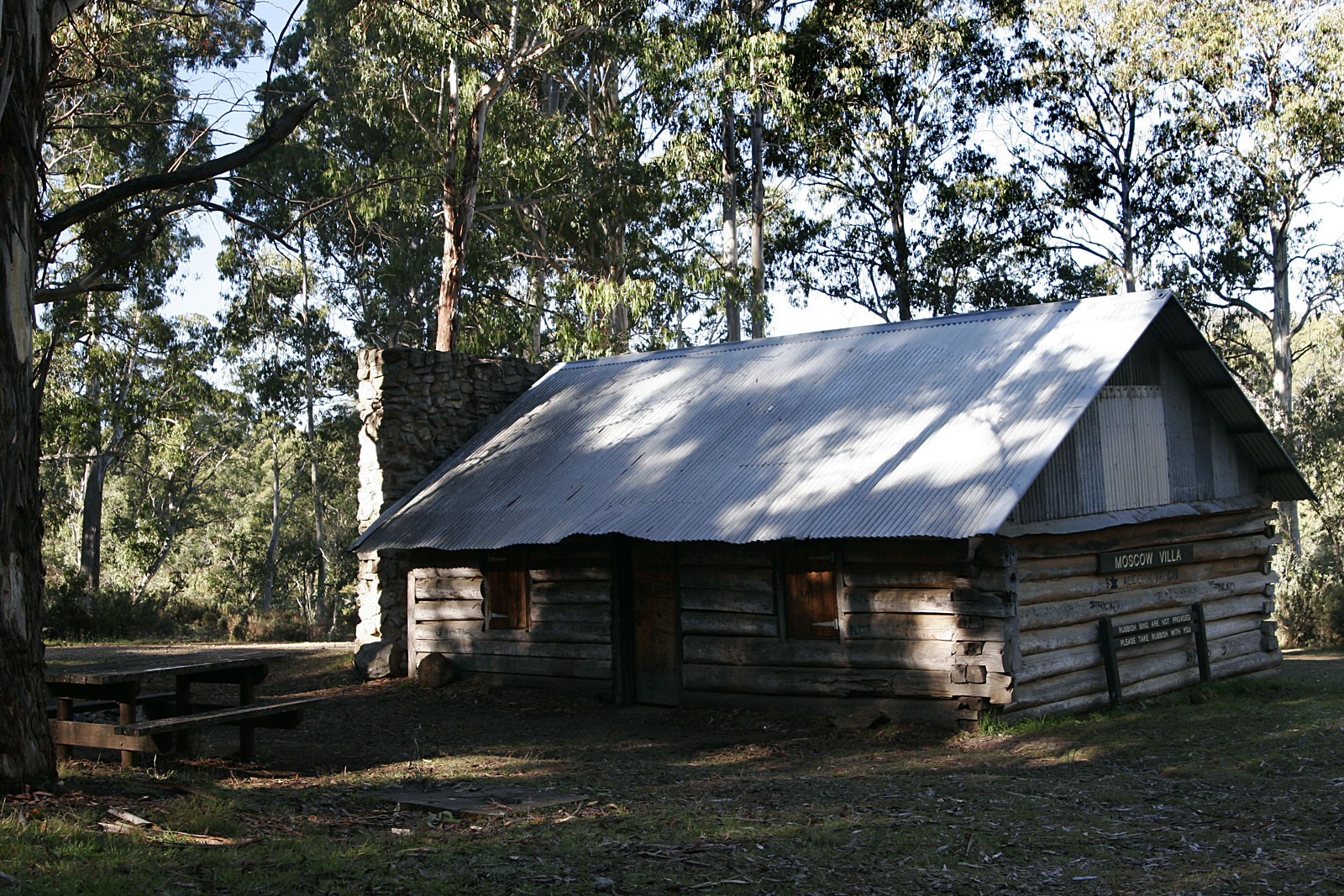
Moscow Villa Hut, Victorian Alps, Australia

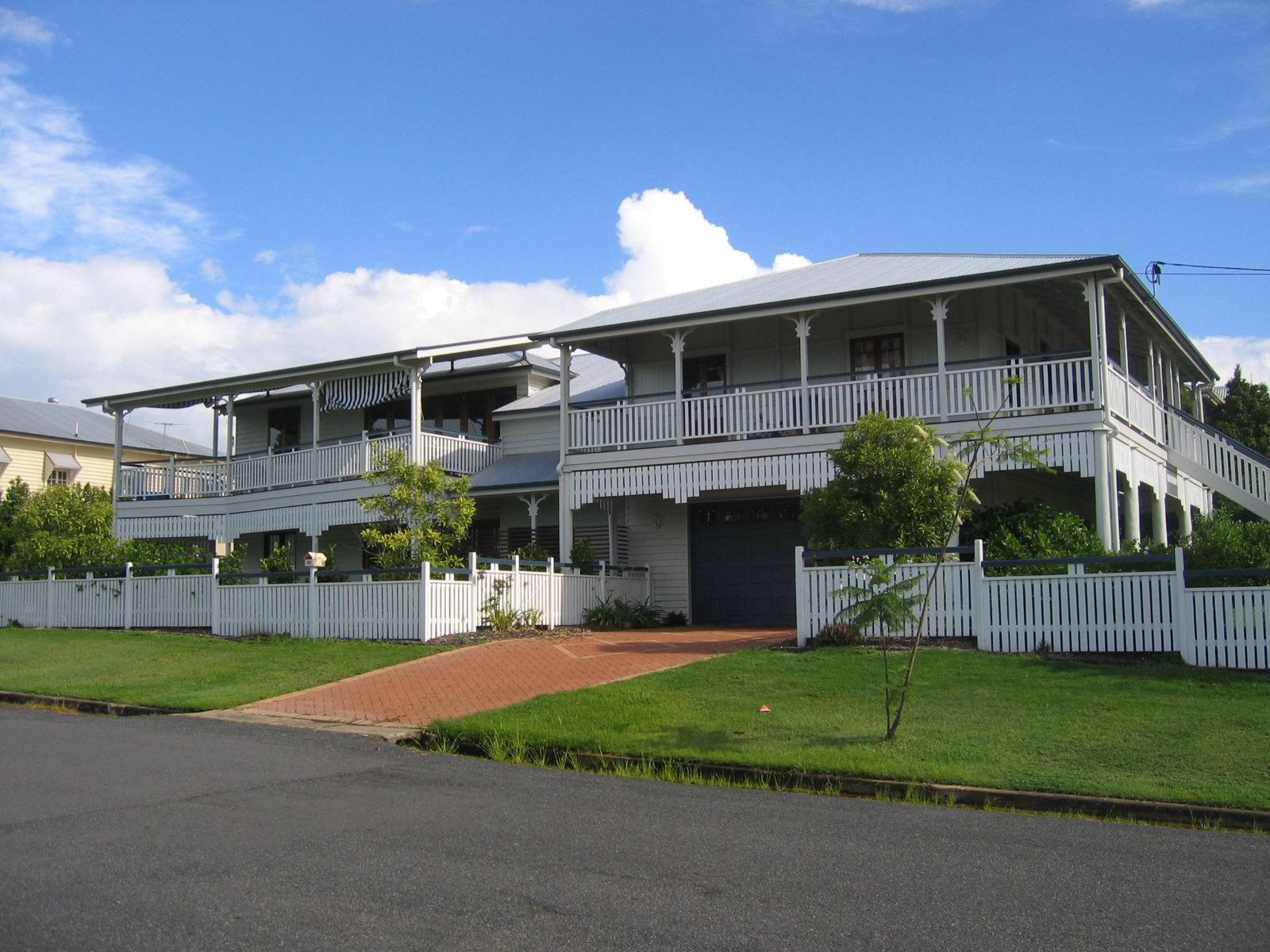
"Queenslanders" in Brisbane, Australia

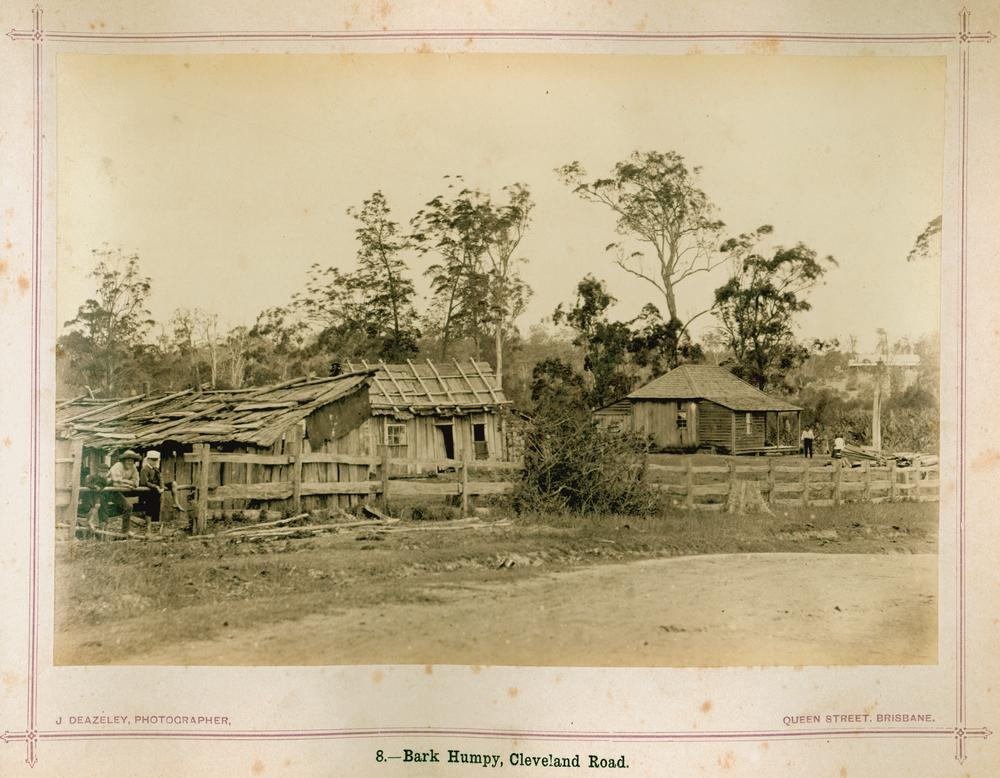
Humpy Brisbane, QLD - a structure, often temporary, made from bark or other available materials

=== Europe ===
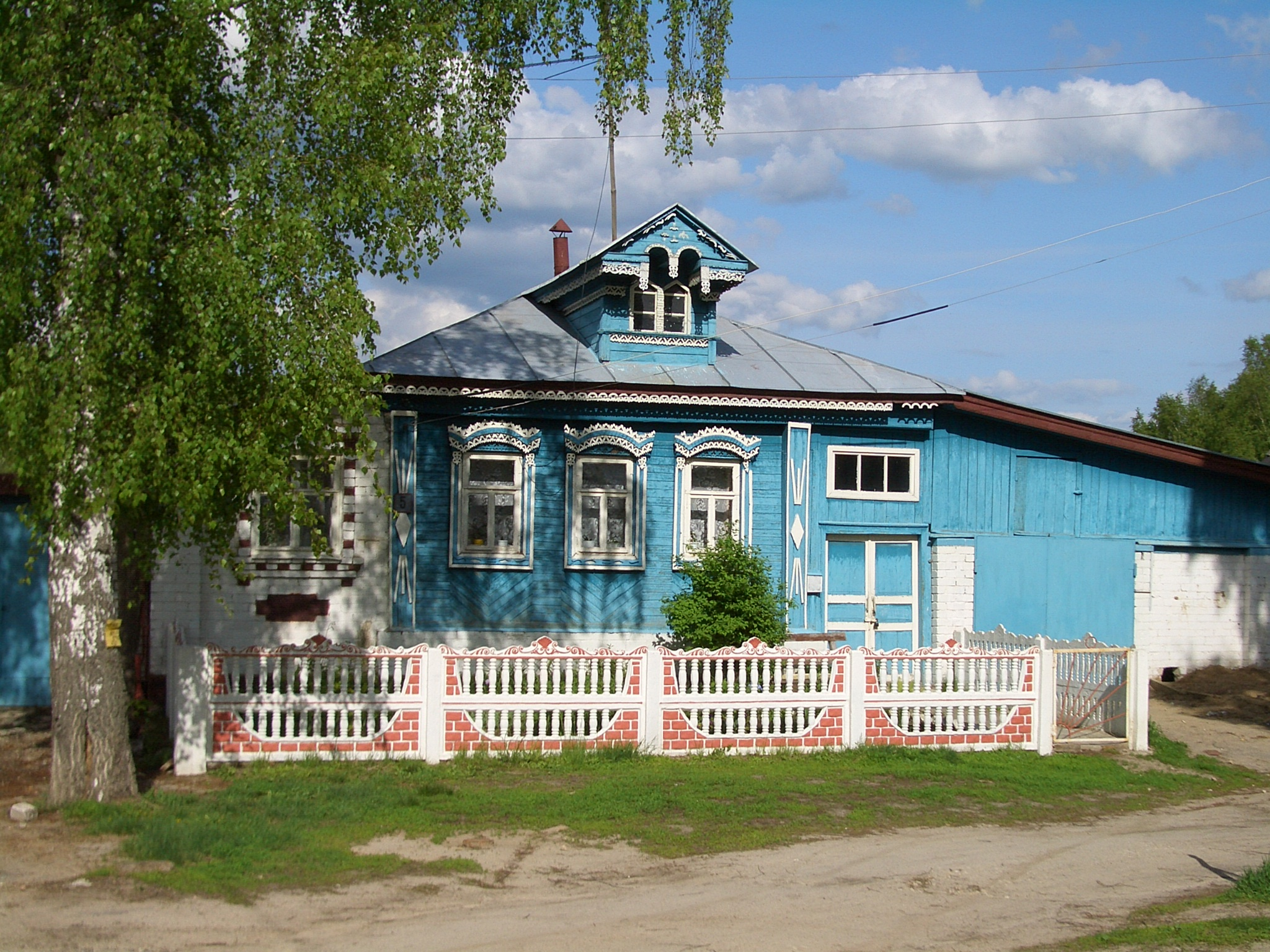
village house near Kstovo, Russia

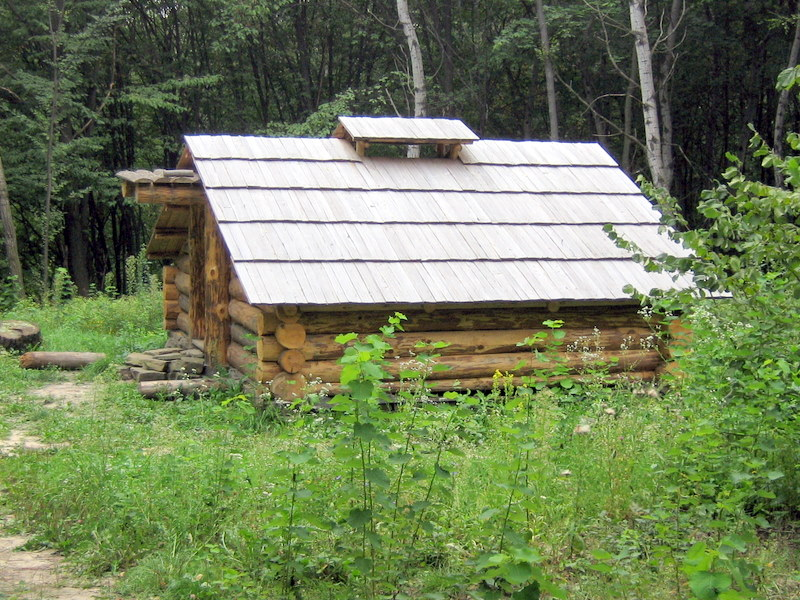
Timber-cutter's mountain log cabin at the Museum of Folk Architecture, Pyrohiv, Ukraine

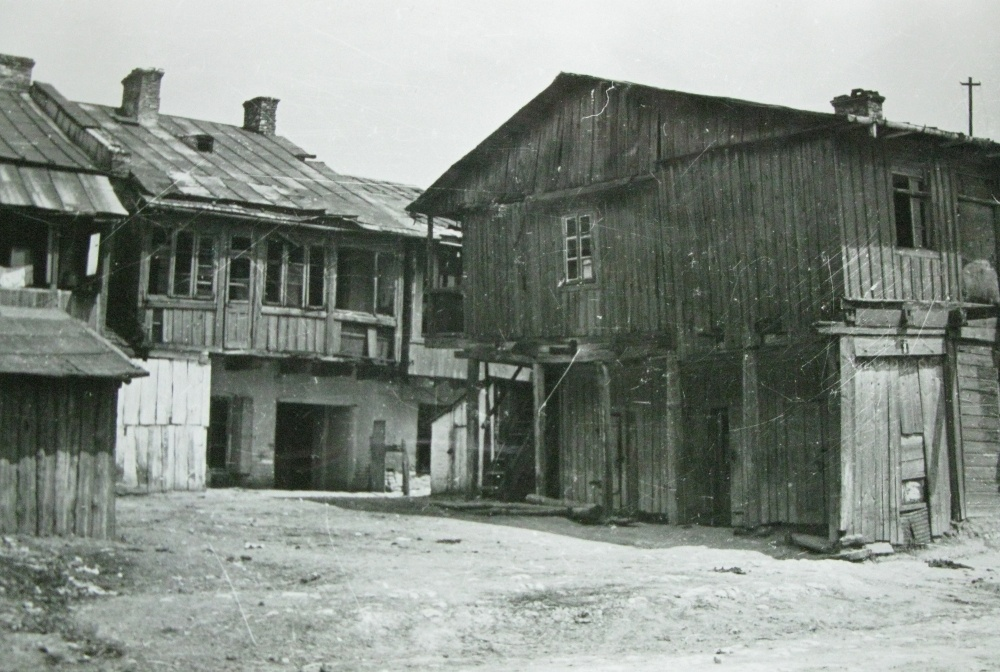
A Jewish village at Bychawa, Poland, prior to WWII

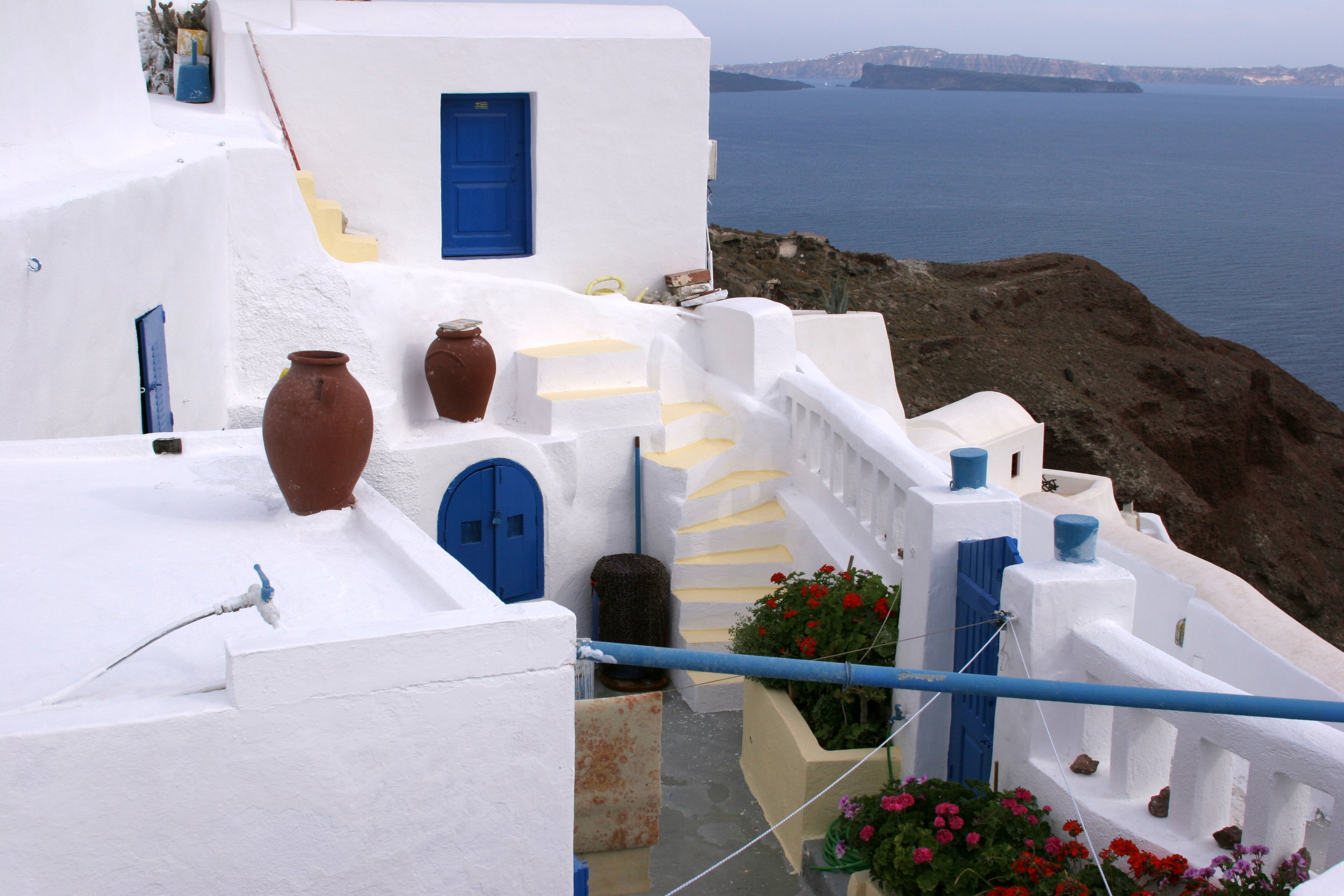
Thick walled, whitewashed houses commonly found on many of Greece's Aegean Islands

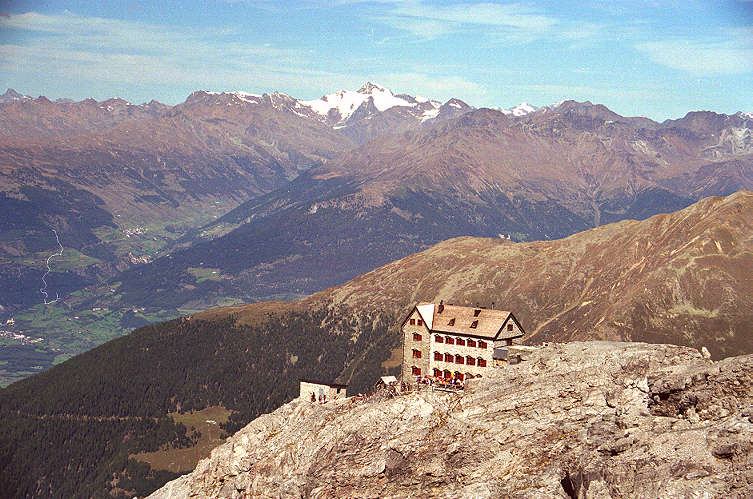
Payerhütte in the Ortler Alps, Italy

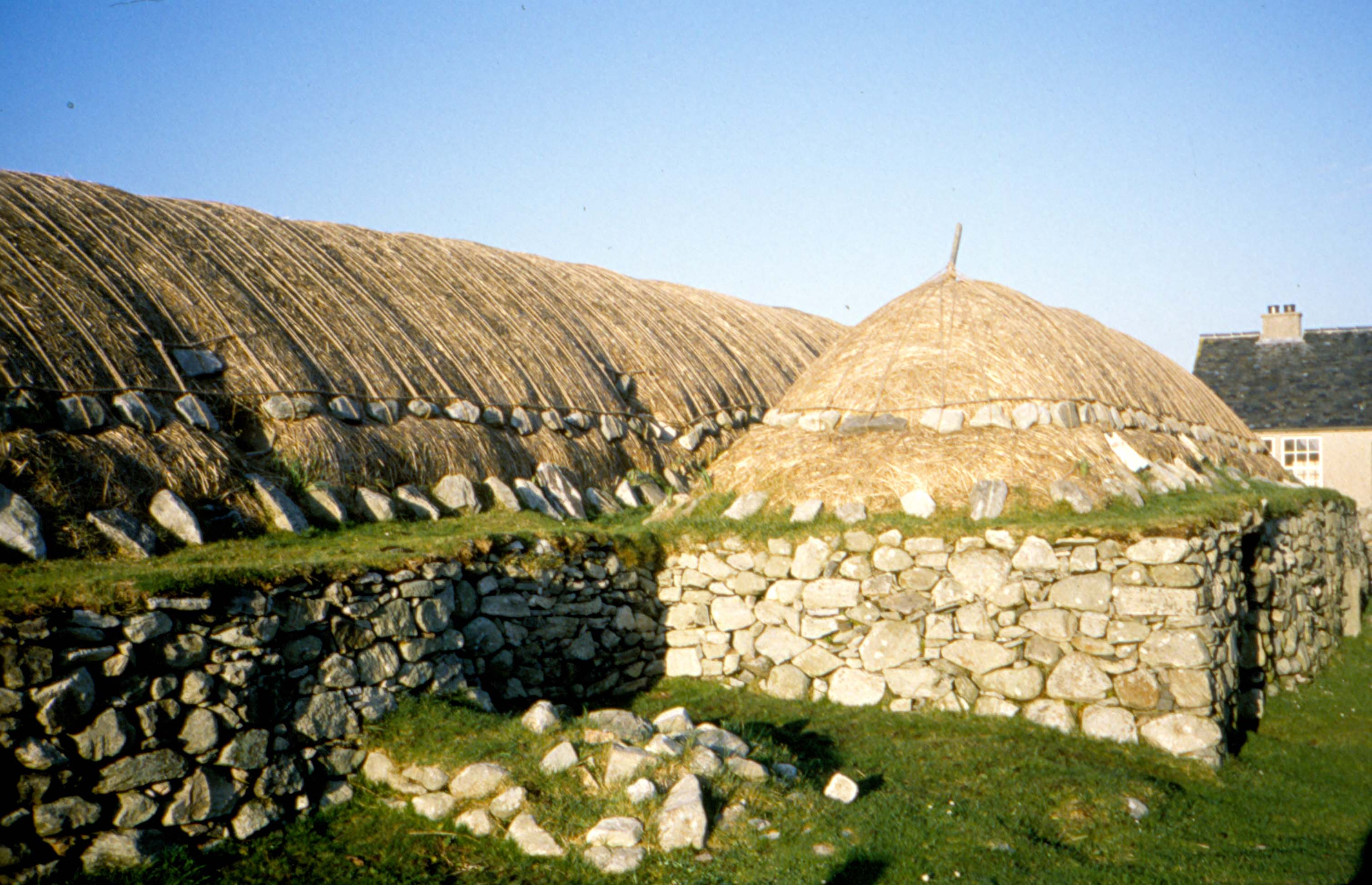
The Blackhouse Museum, Arnol, Isle of Lewis, Scotland

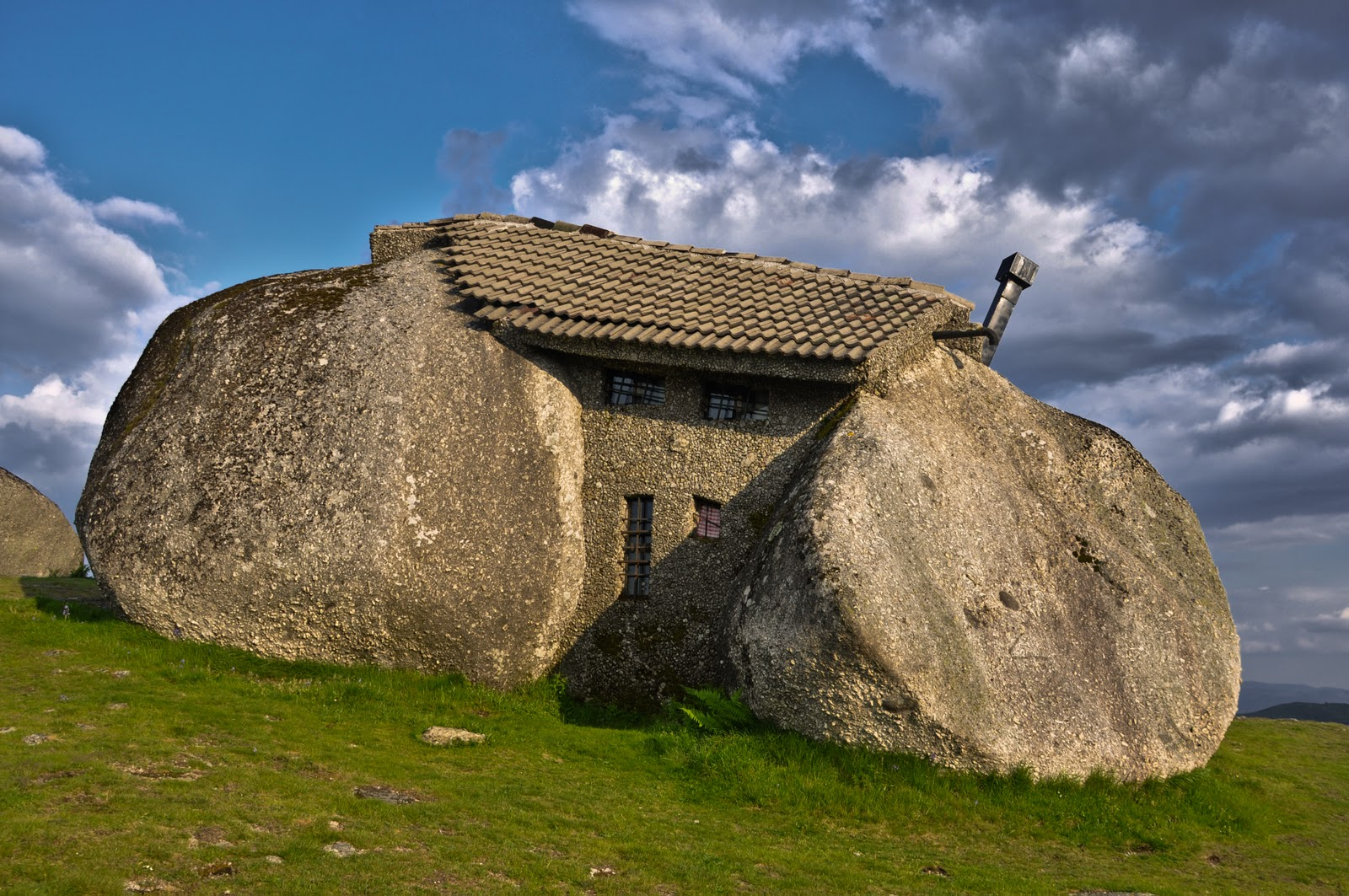
Casa do Penedo, Portugal

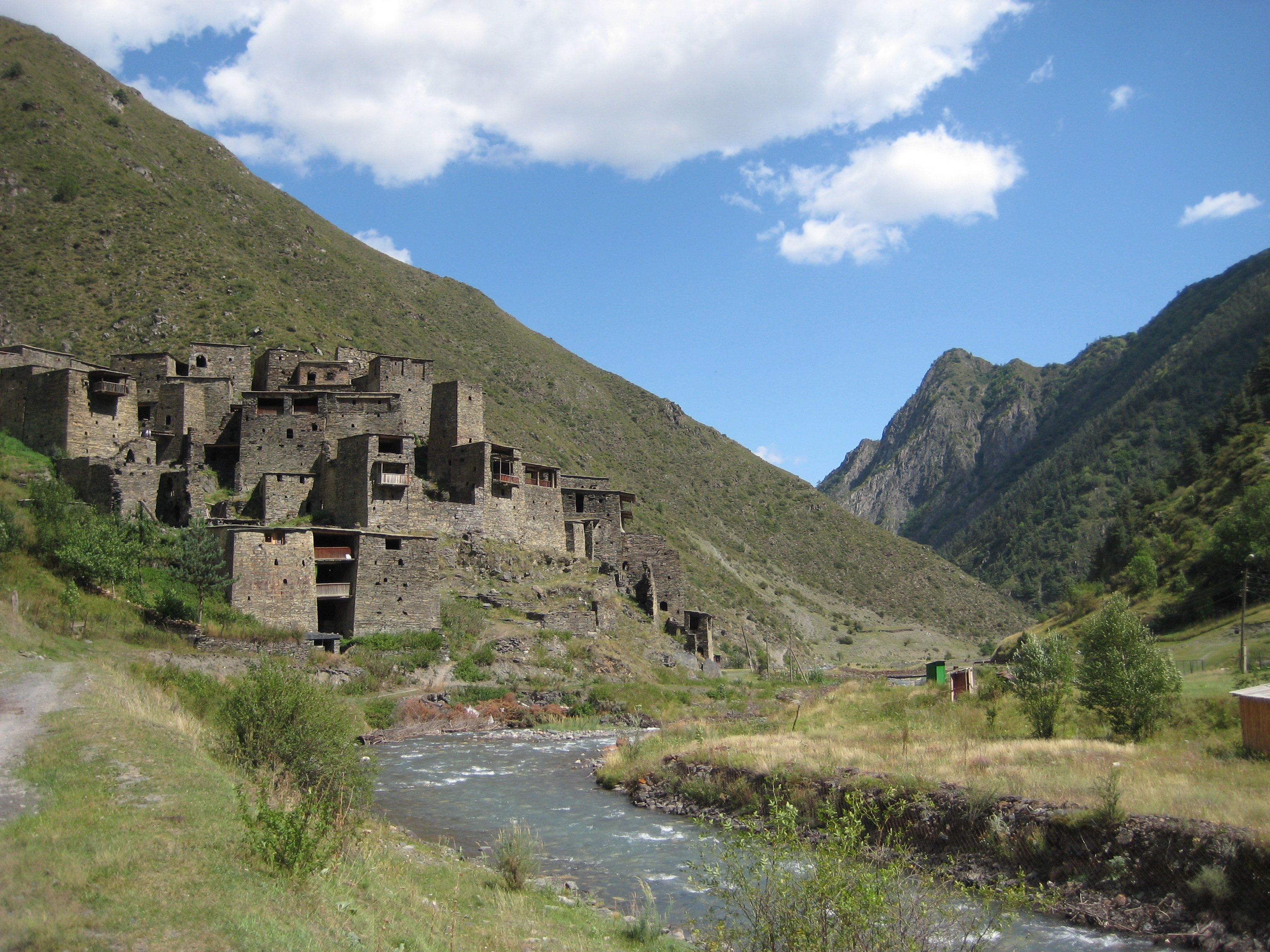
Defensive housing in Shatili, Georgia

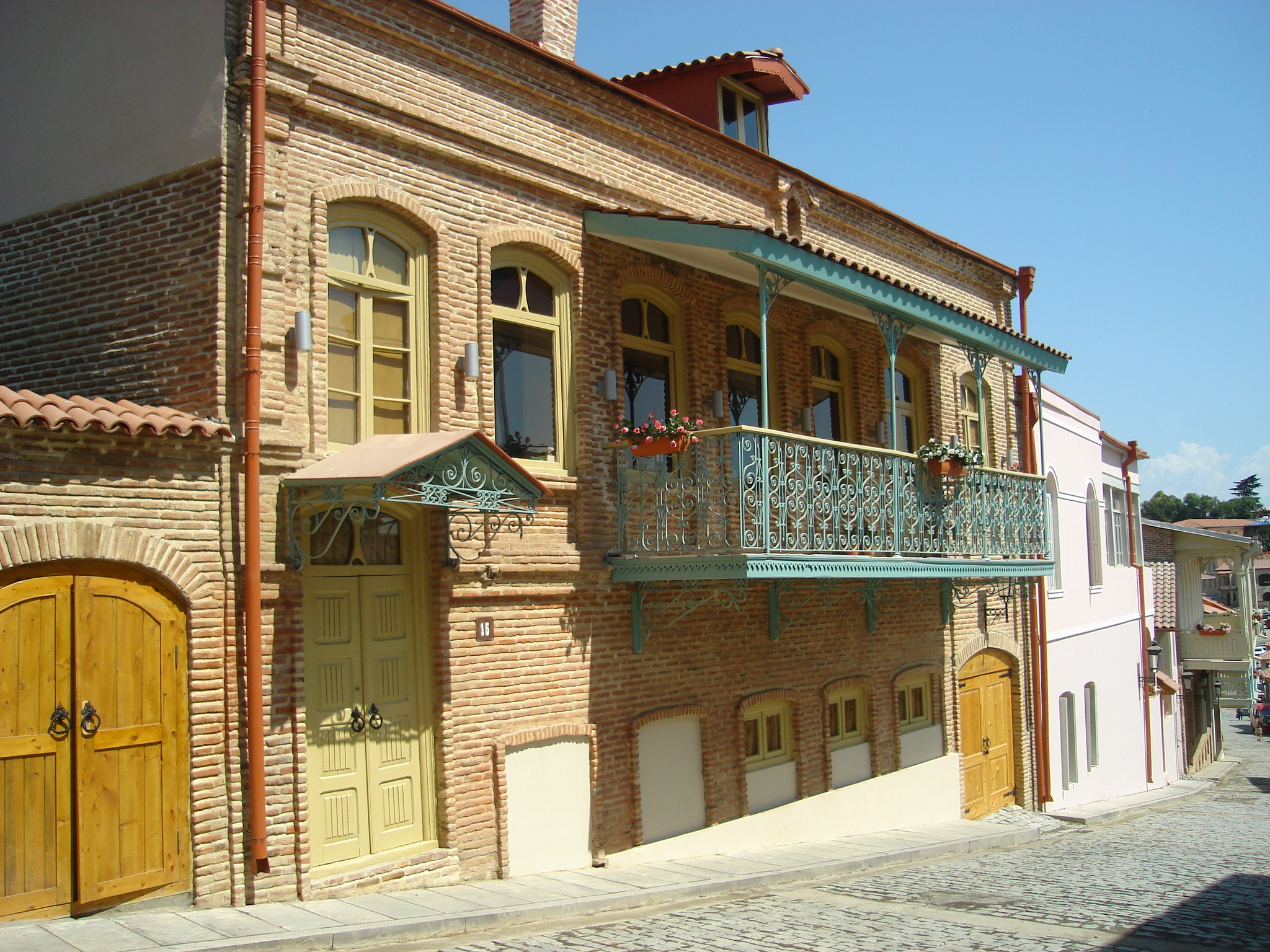
Old houses in Sighnaghi, Georgia

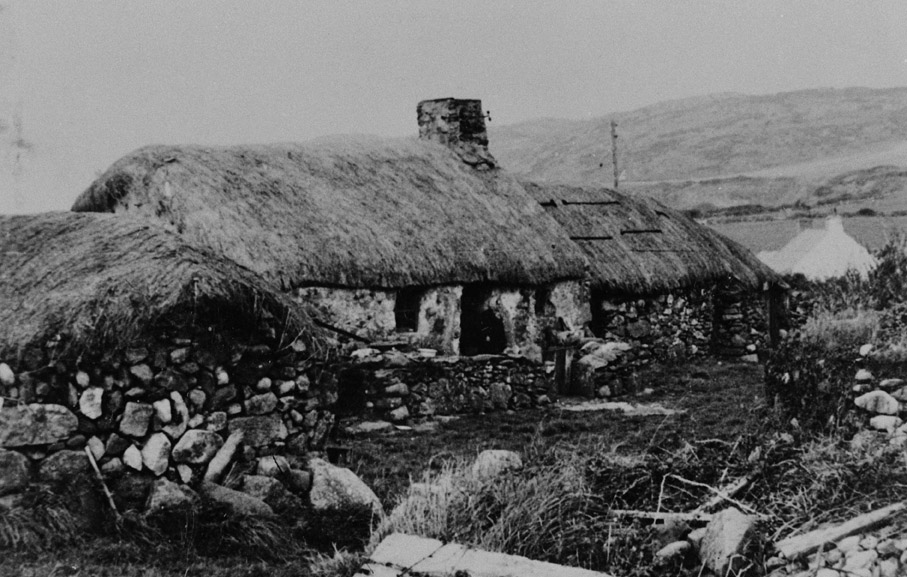
Welsh thatched longhouse, named Swtan, dating back to the 16th century. Anglesey, Wales

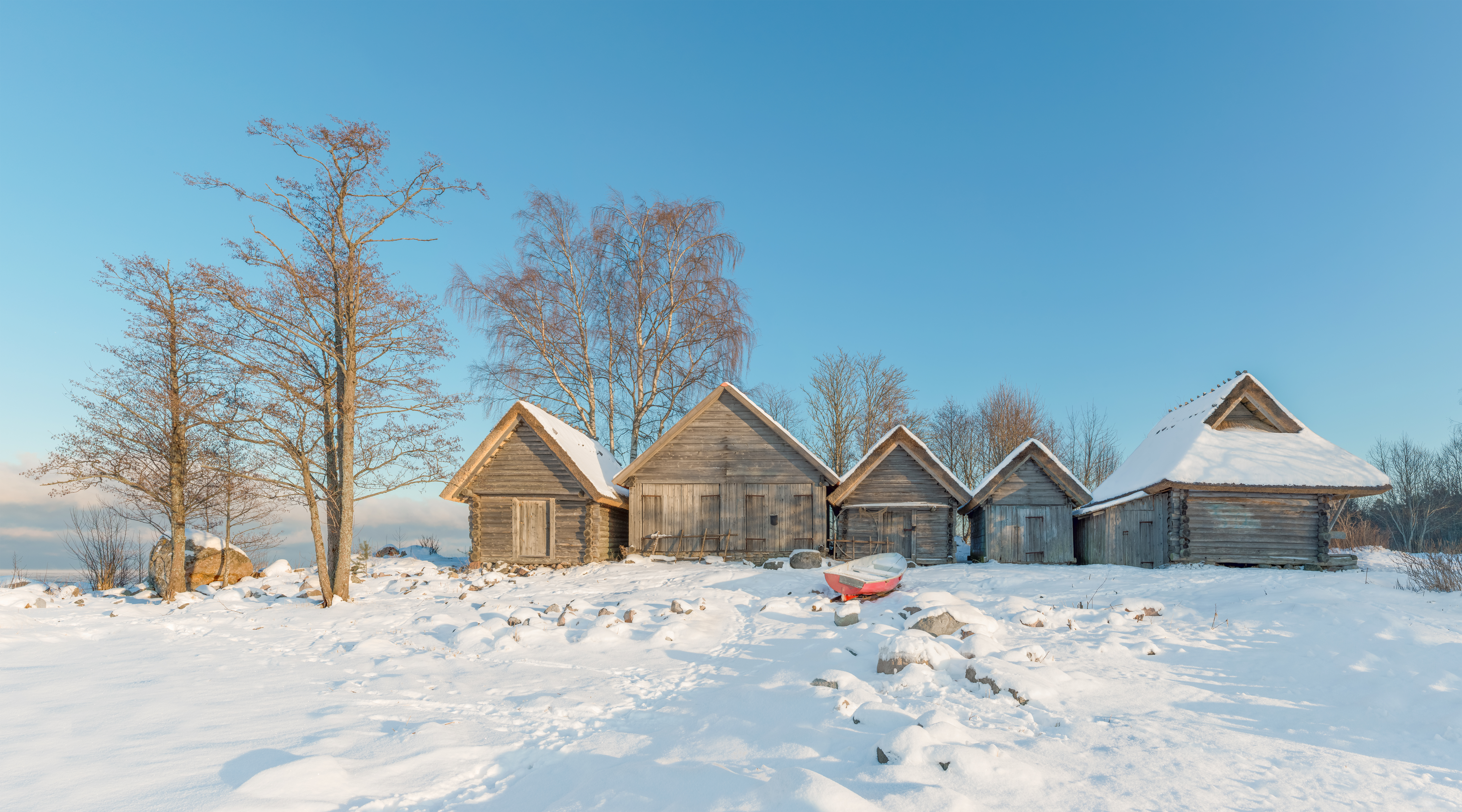
Fishermen huts in Altja, Estonia

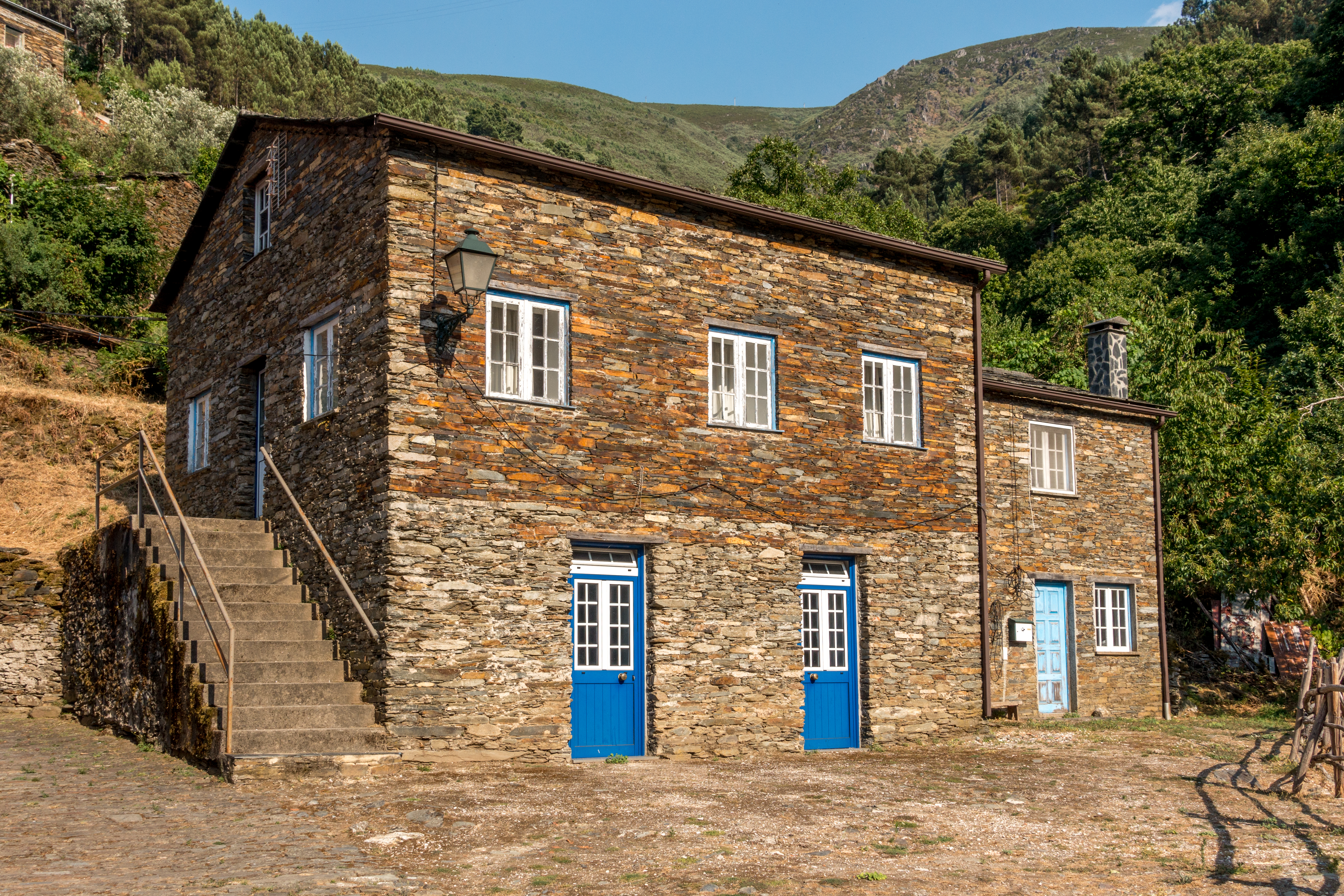
Houses of Schist, Lousã Hills, Portugal

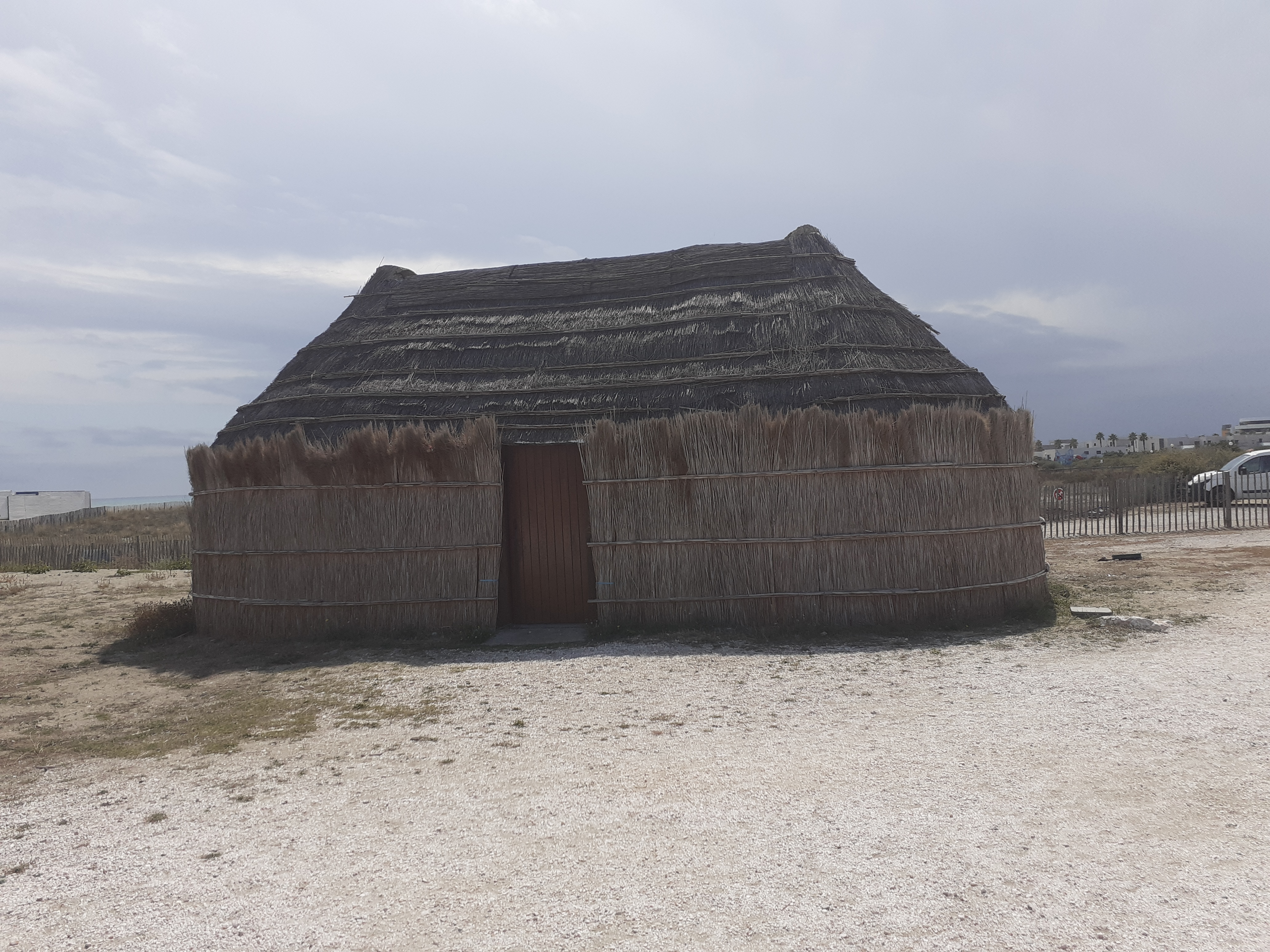
Le Barcarès 19th century fishing hut, France

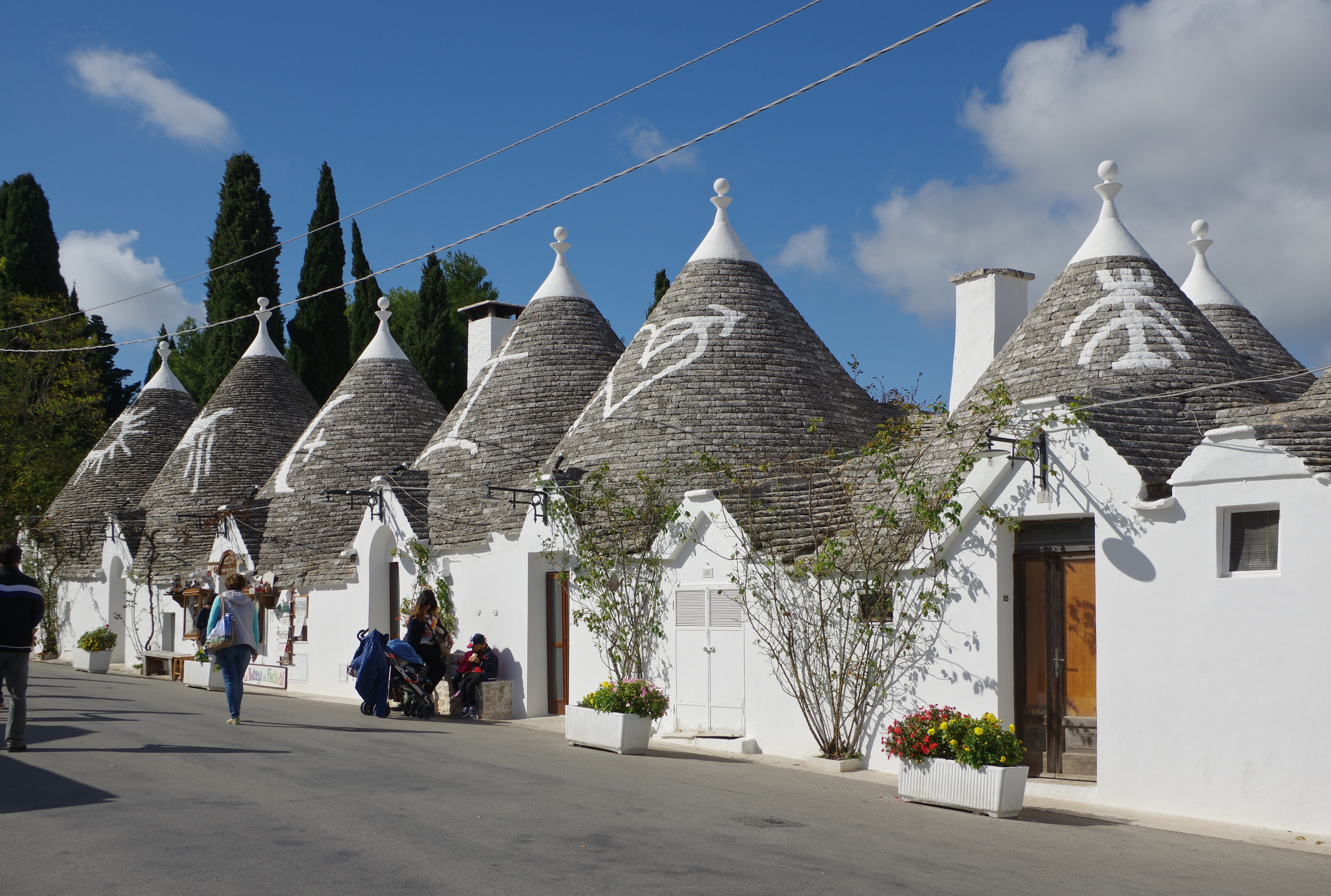
Trulli in Apulia, Italy

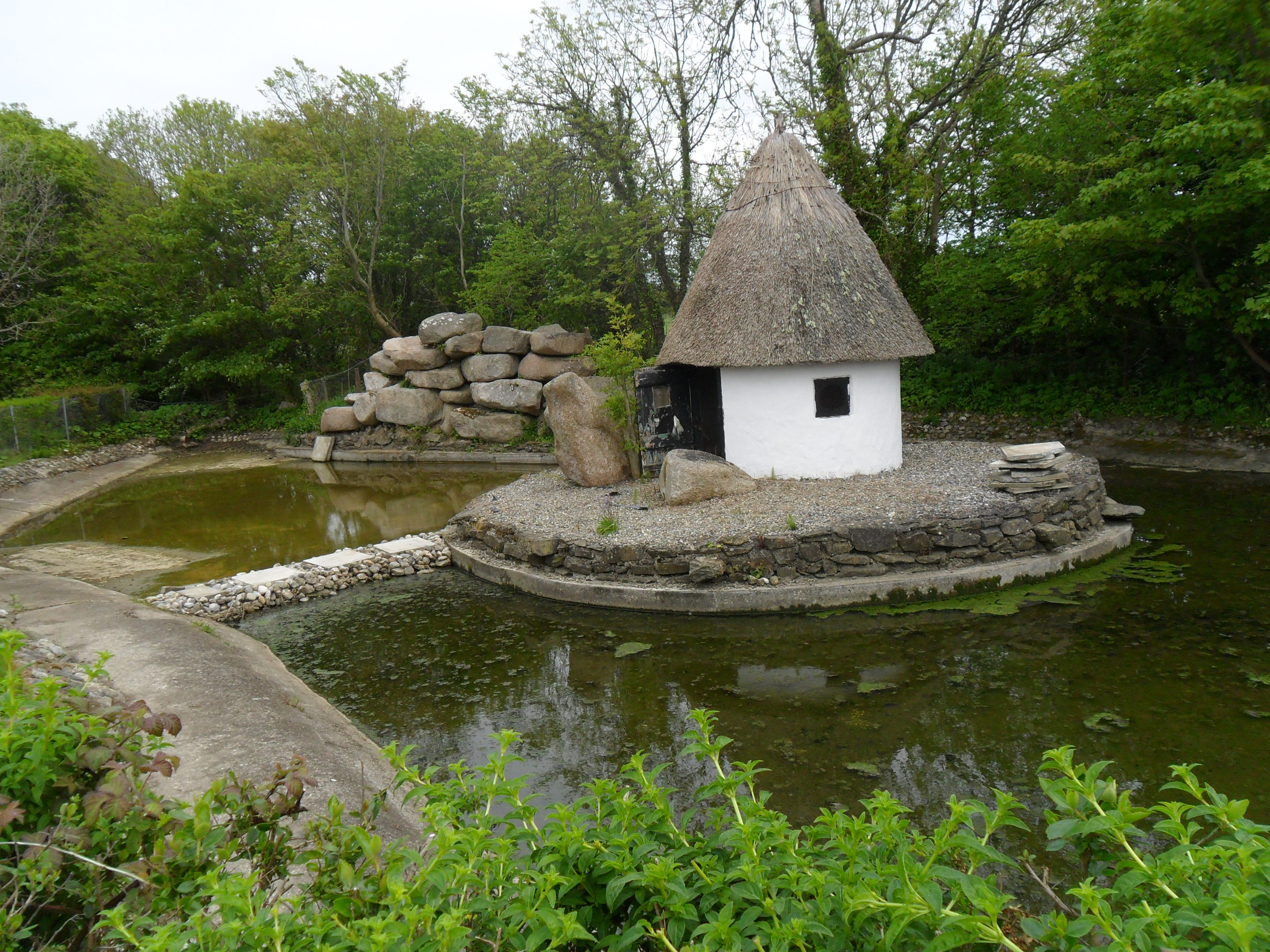
Yola hut in Tagoat, County Wexford, Ireland

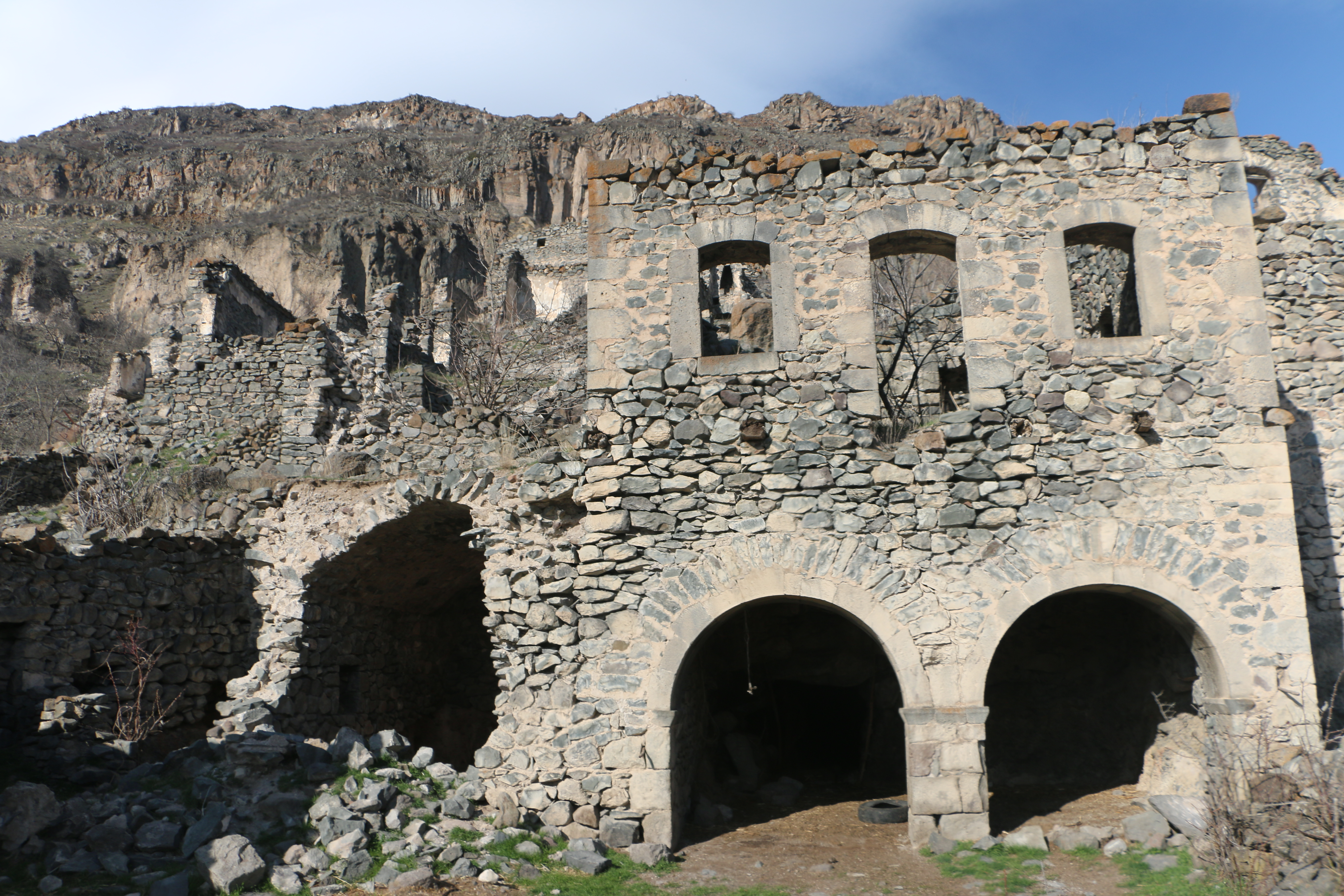
Old house in the Khot village of Syunik, Armenia

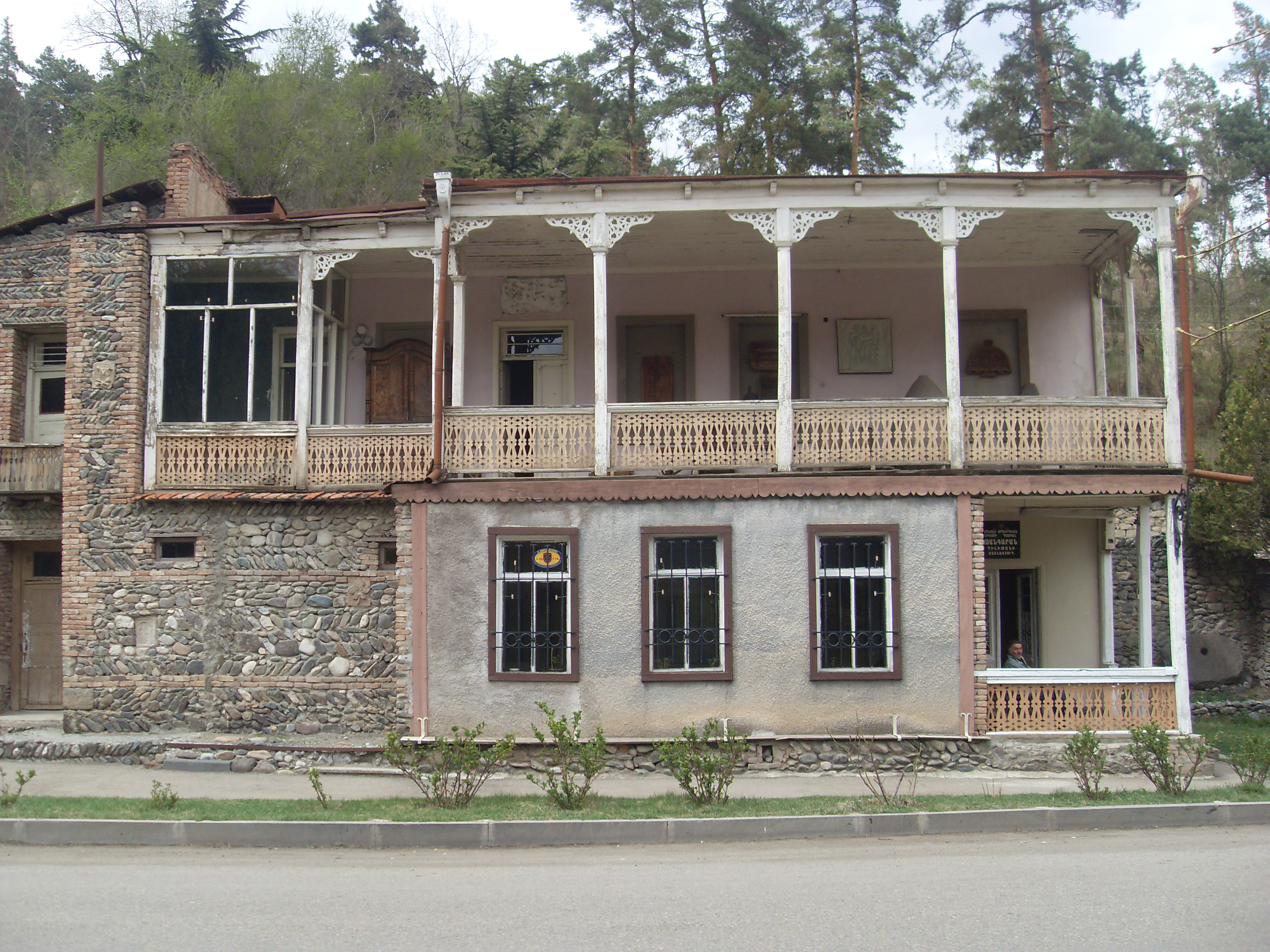
Dilijan museum of traditional art in Tavush, Armenia

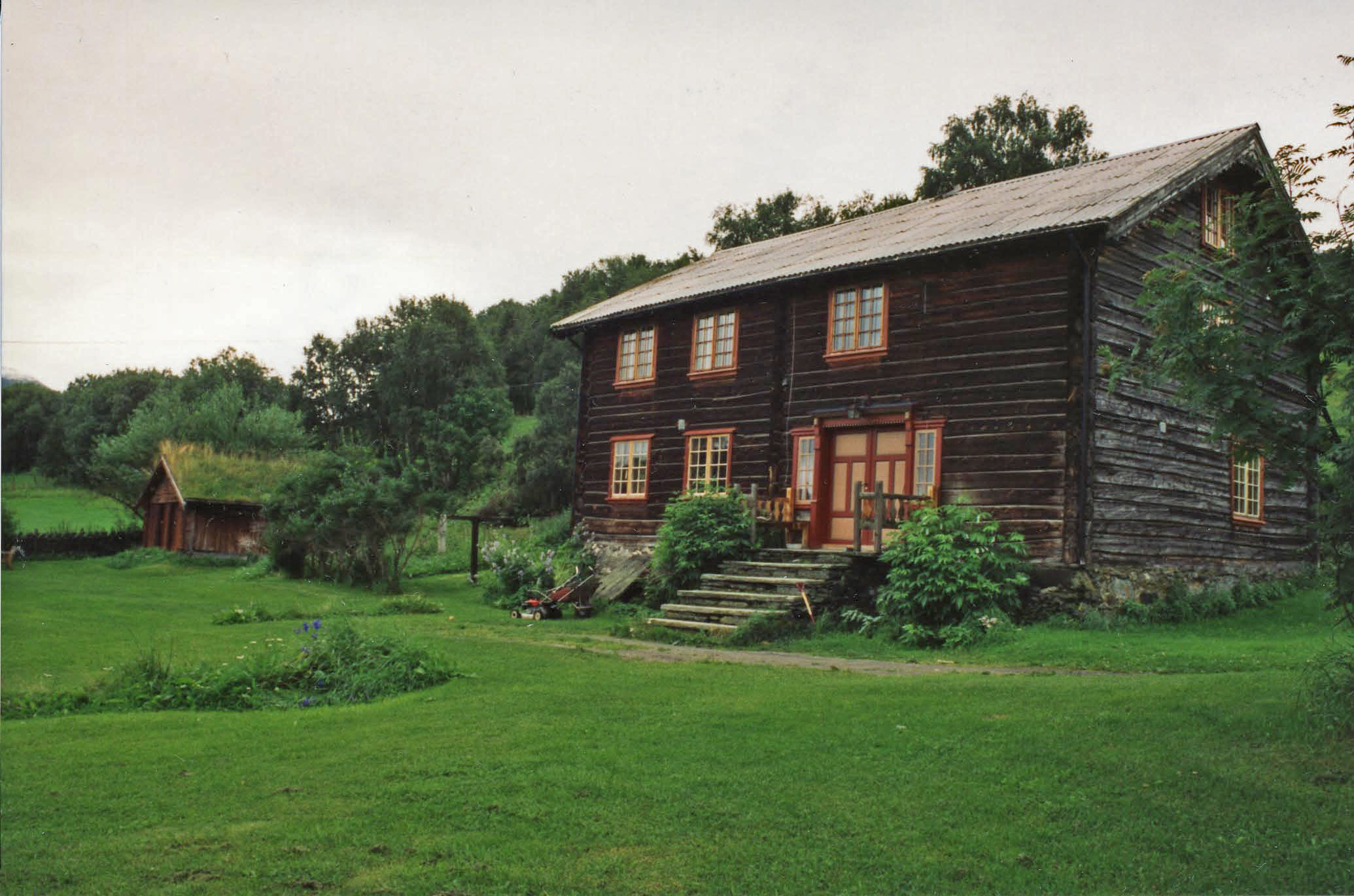
Trønderlåne in Oppdal, Norway

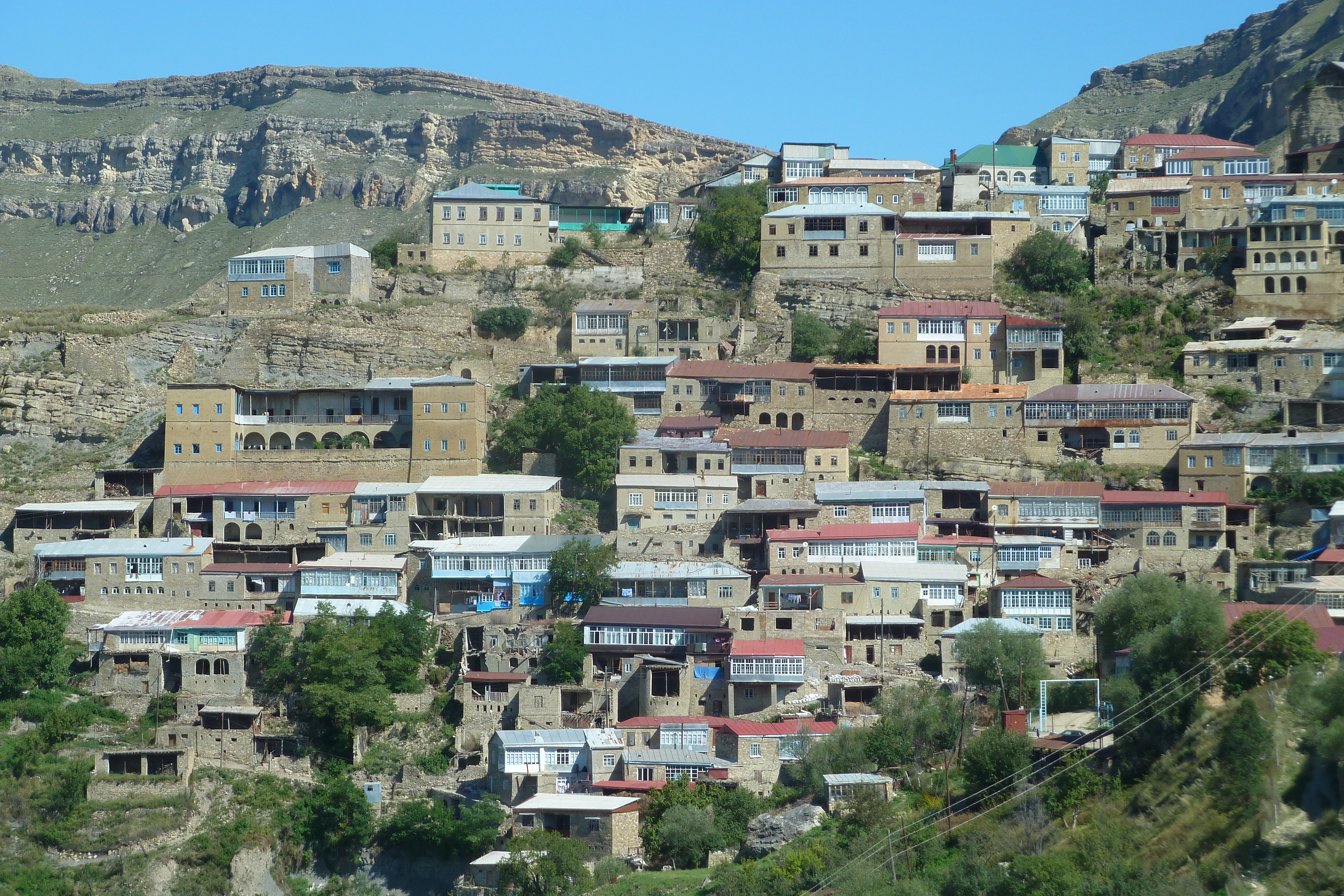
Dagestani saklyas in Chokh aul

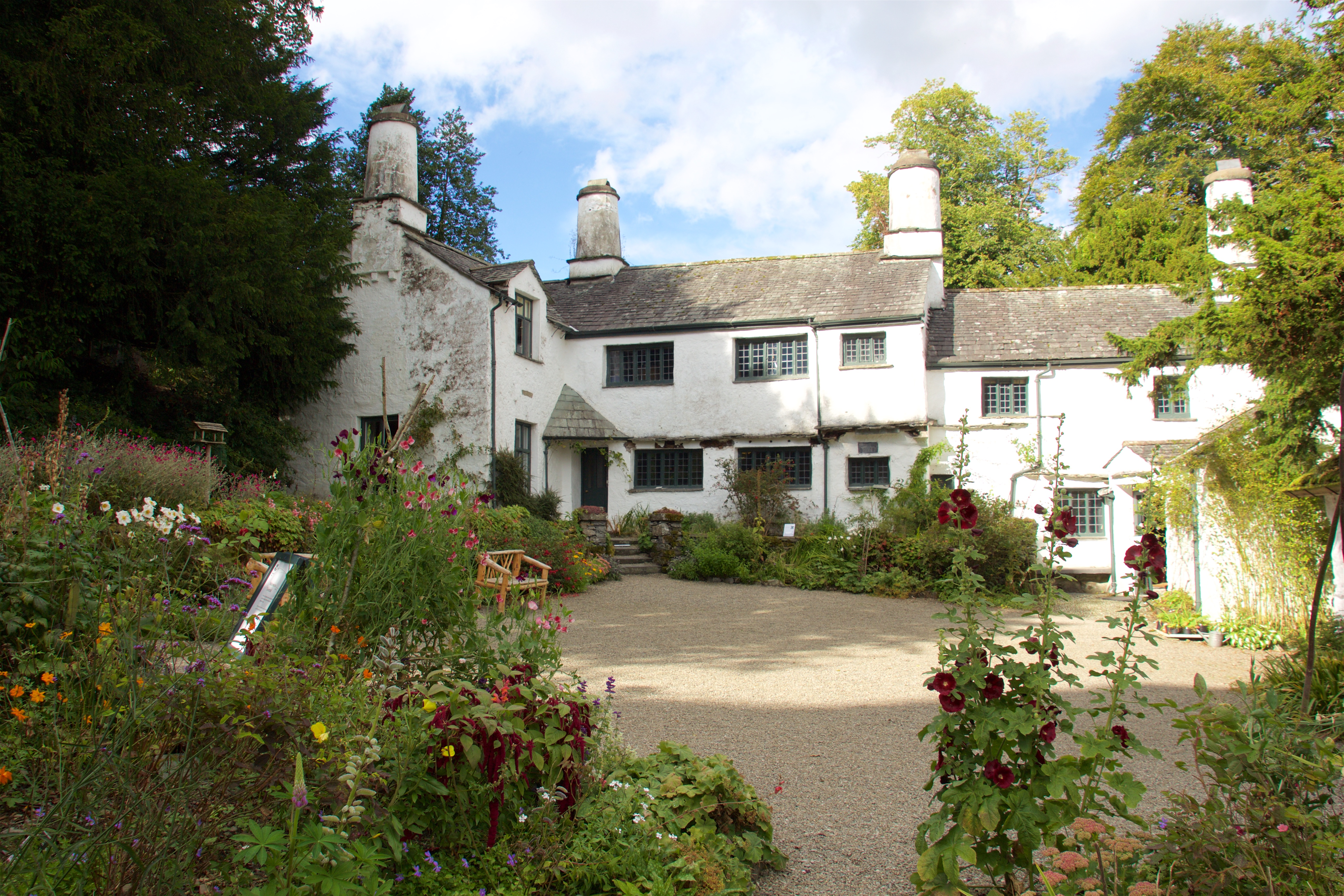
Townend, Cumbria, England, 17th century

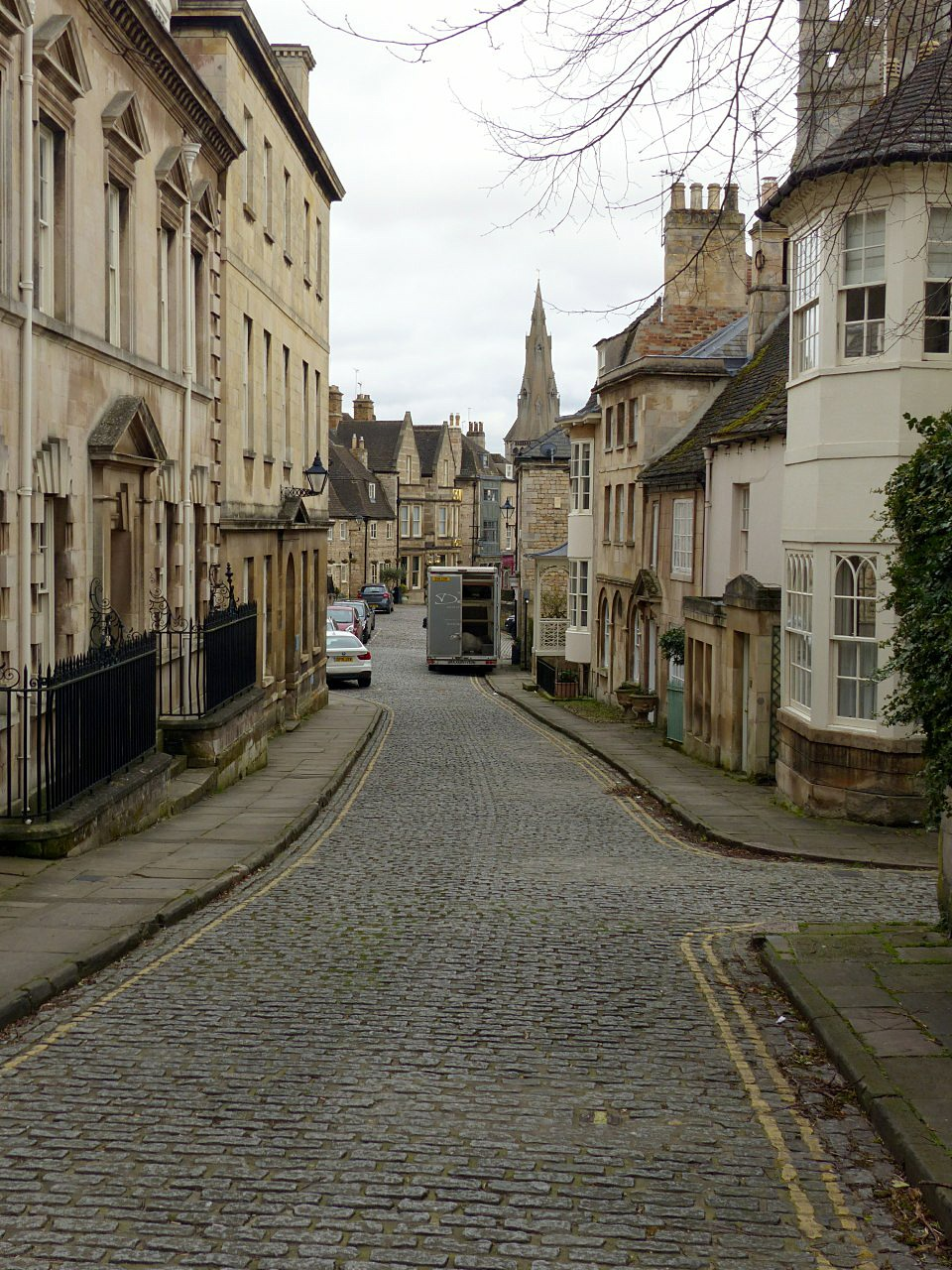
Houses in Barn Hill, Stamford, Lincolnshire, England, 17th-19th centuries

=== North America ===
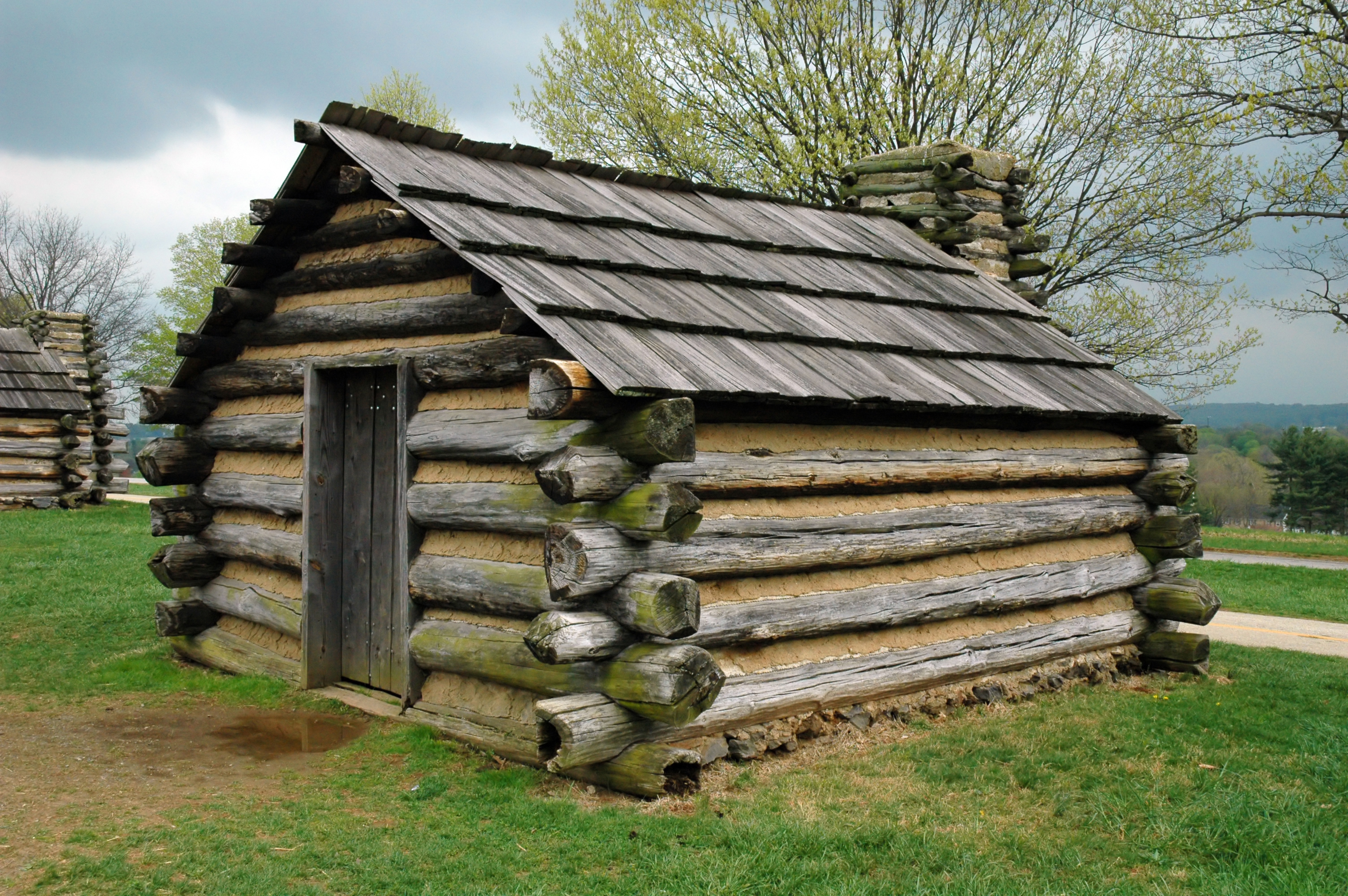
Replica log cabin at Valley Forge, Pennsylvania

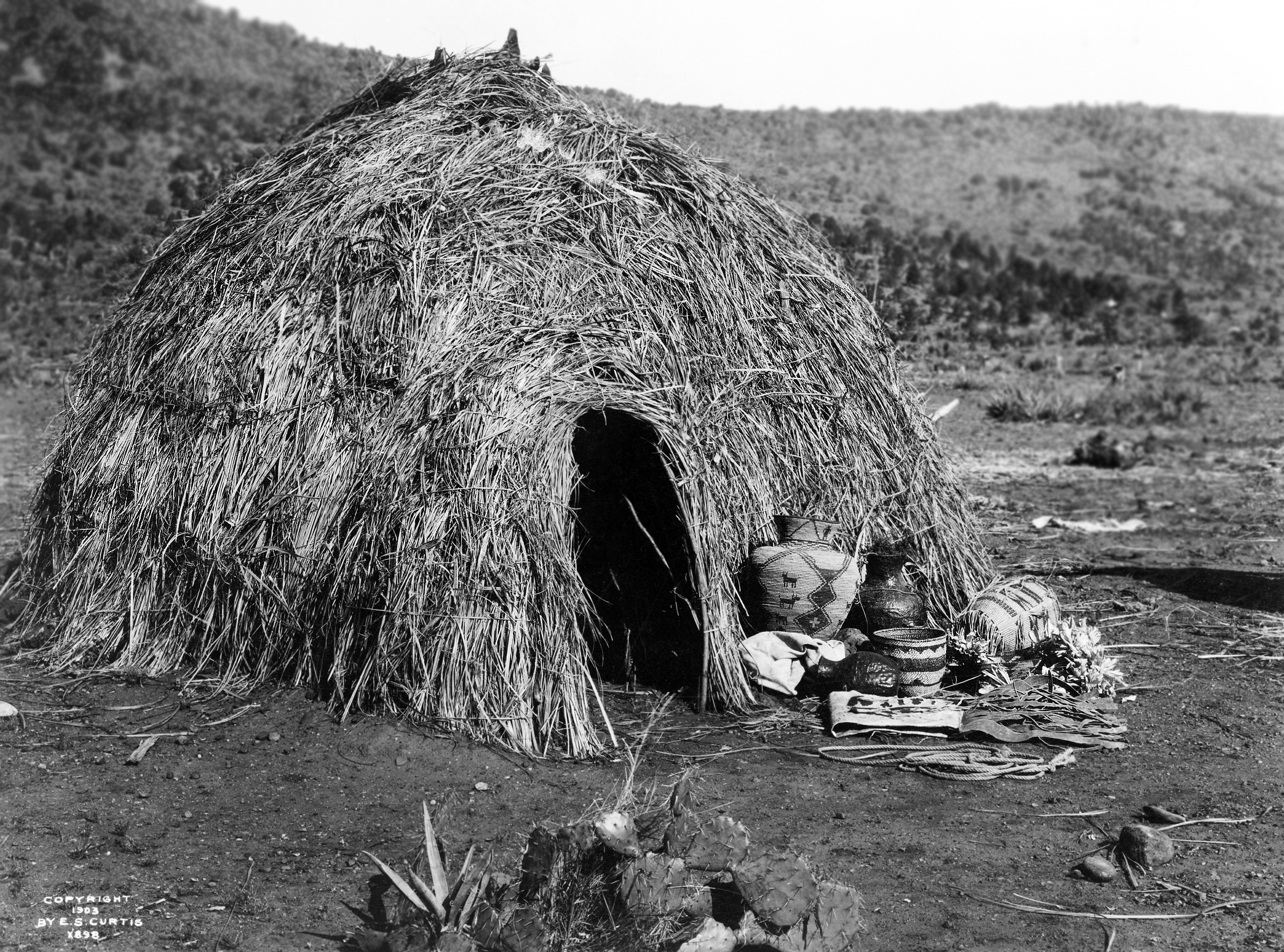
Apache Wickiup

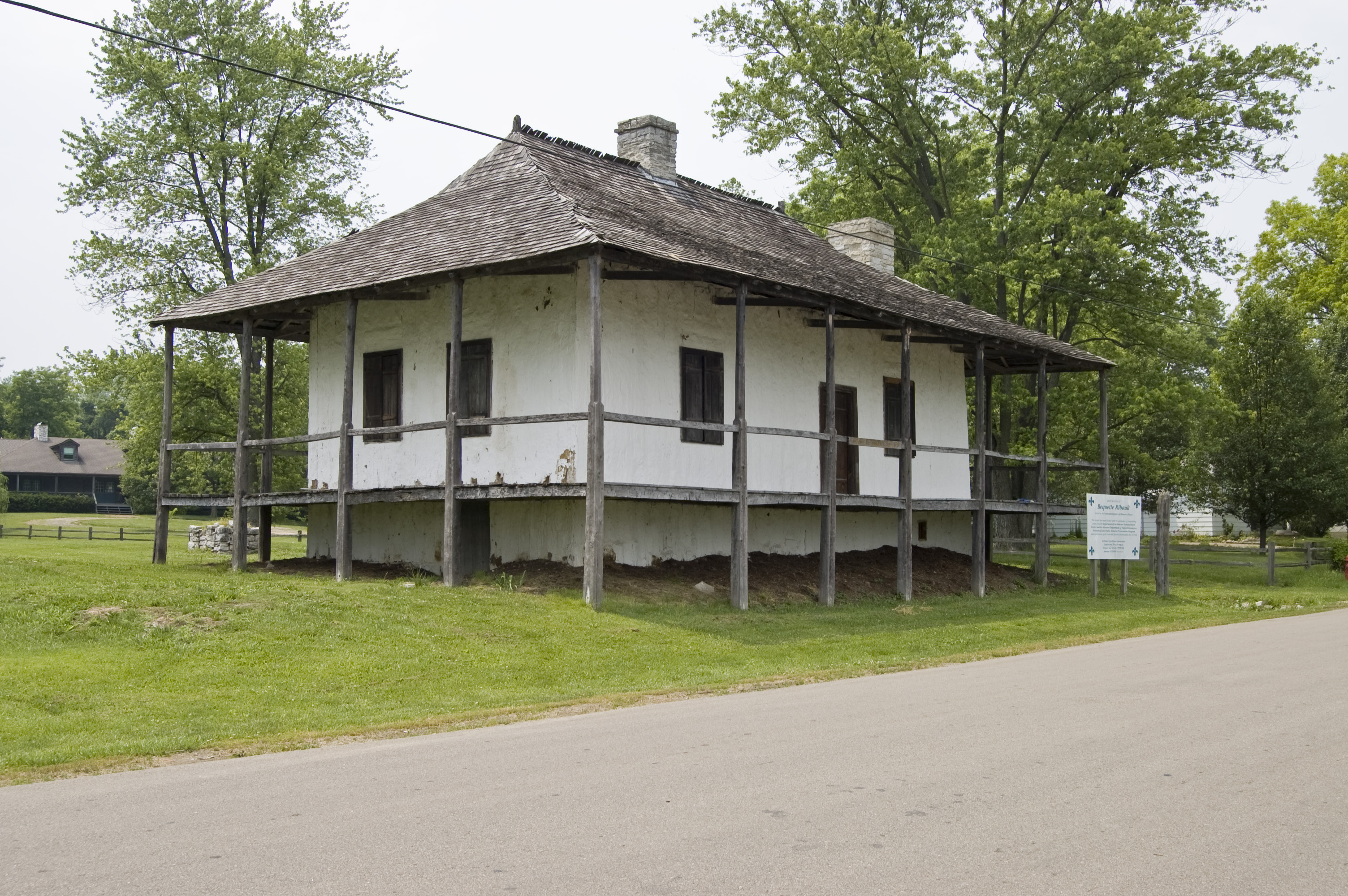
The Maison Bequette-Ribault, a French style building in Ste. Genevieve, Missouri

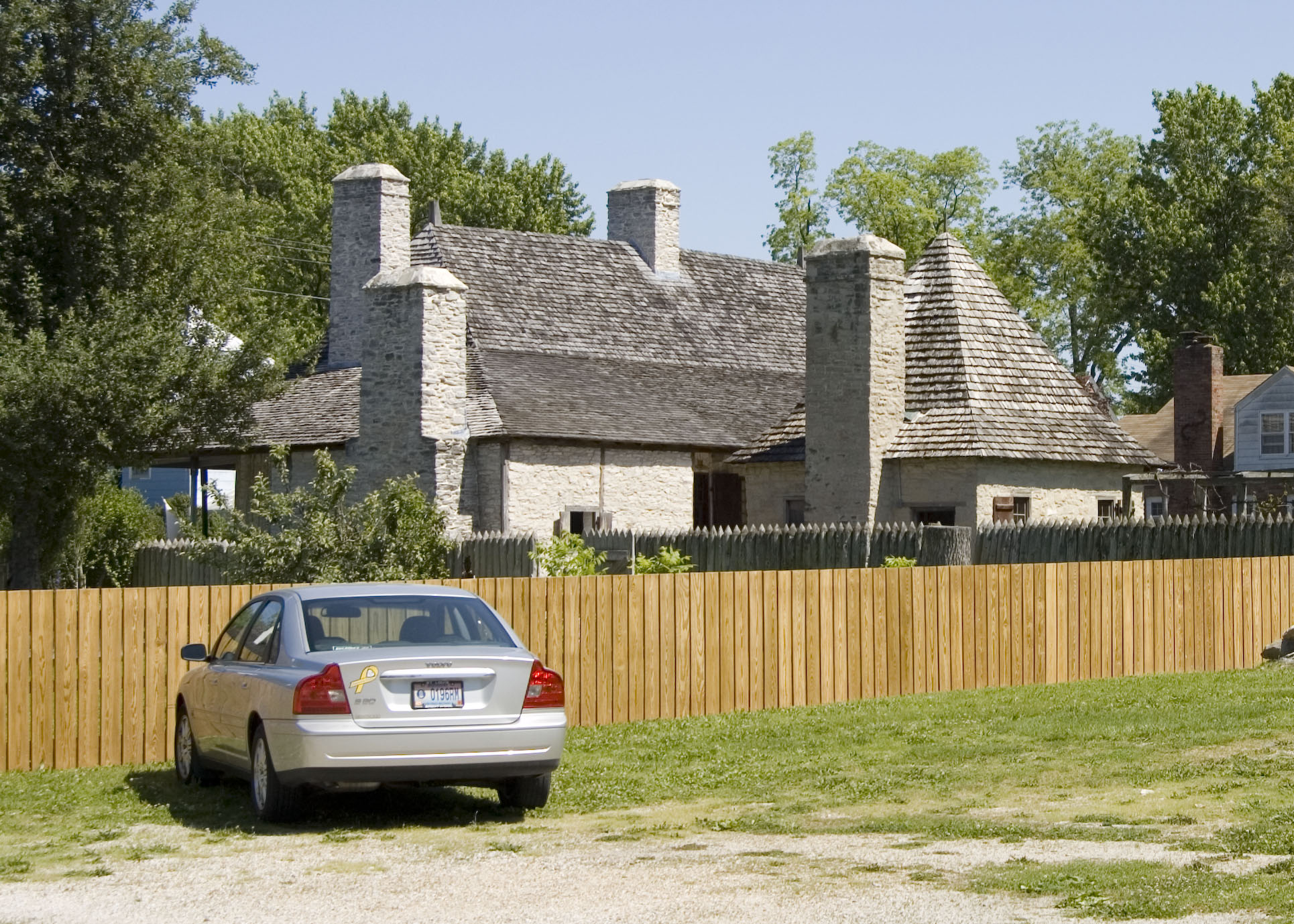
Maison Bolduc, in Ste. Genevieve, Missouri is a grander building in the same style as the Maison Bequette-Ribault.

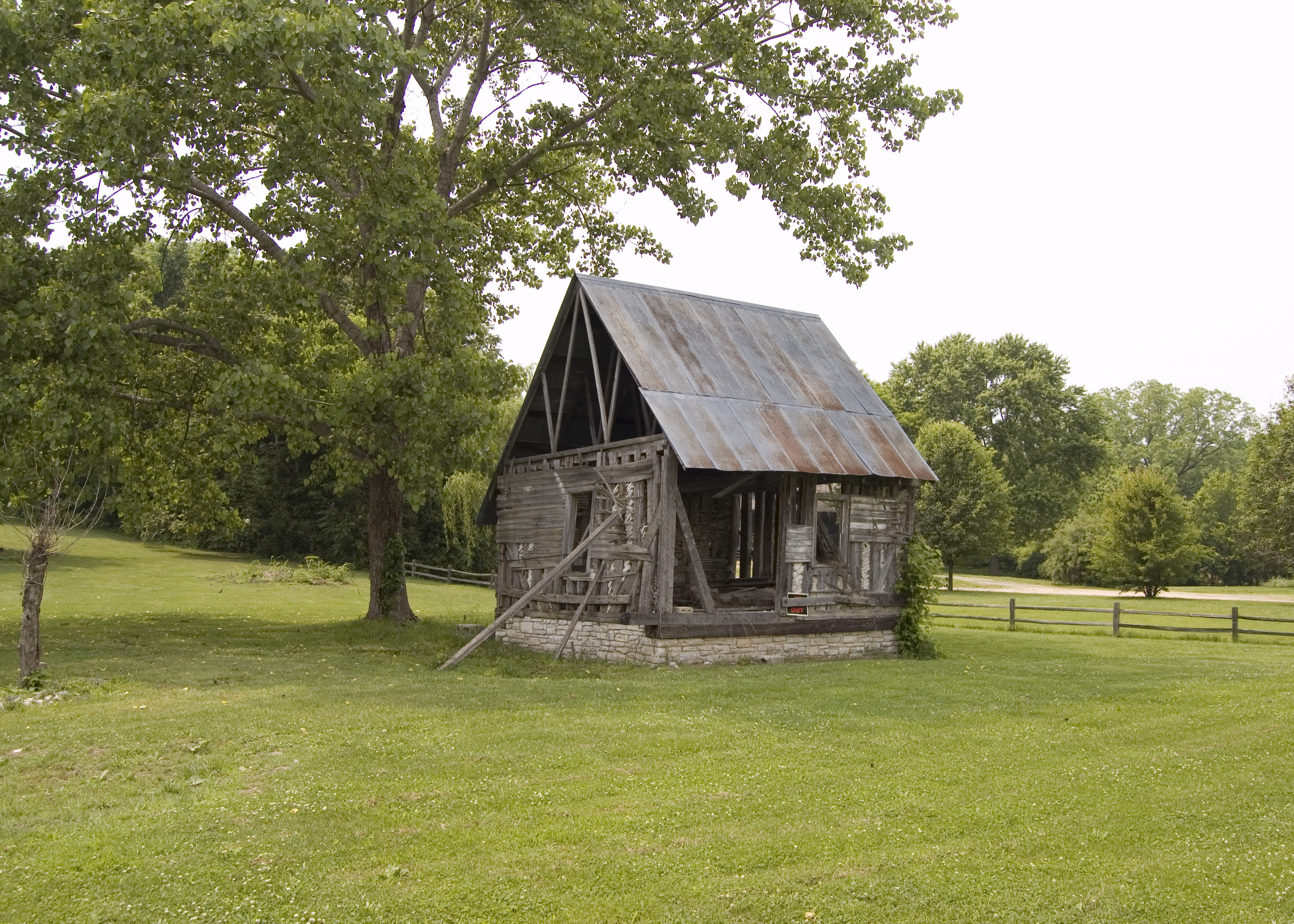
The Lasource-Durand house in Ste. Genevieve, Missouri

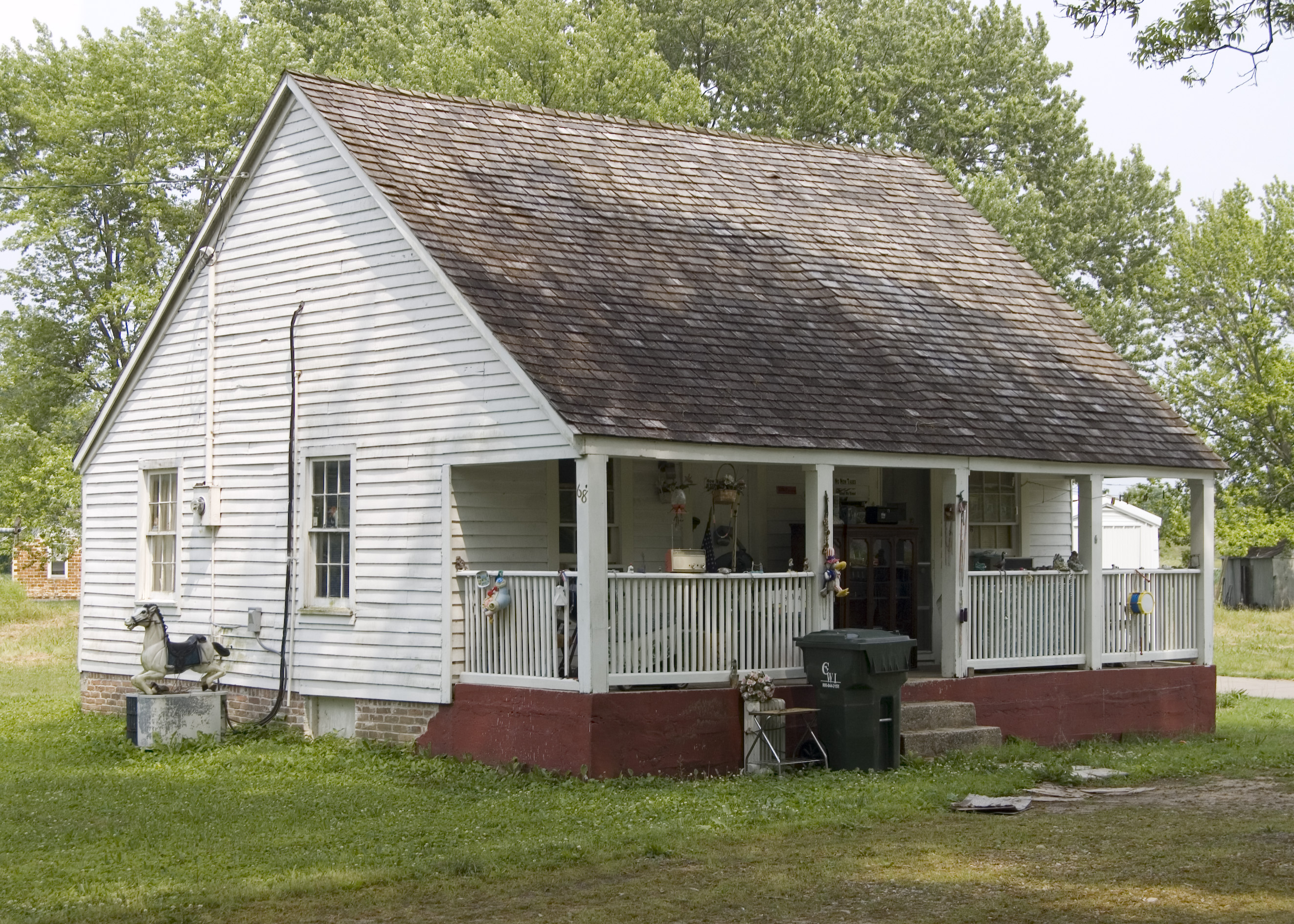
A house on Gabouri Creek in Ste. Genevieve, Missouri

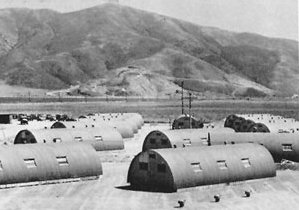
Quonset huts in Point Mugu, California in 1946 (Laguna Peak in background)

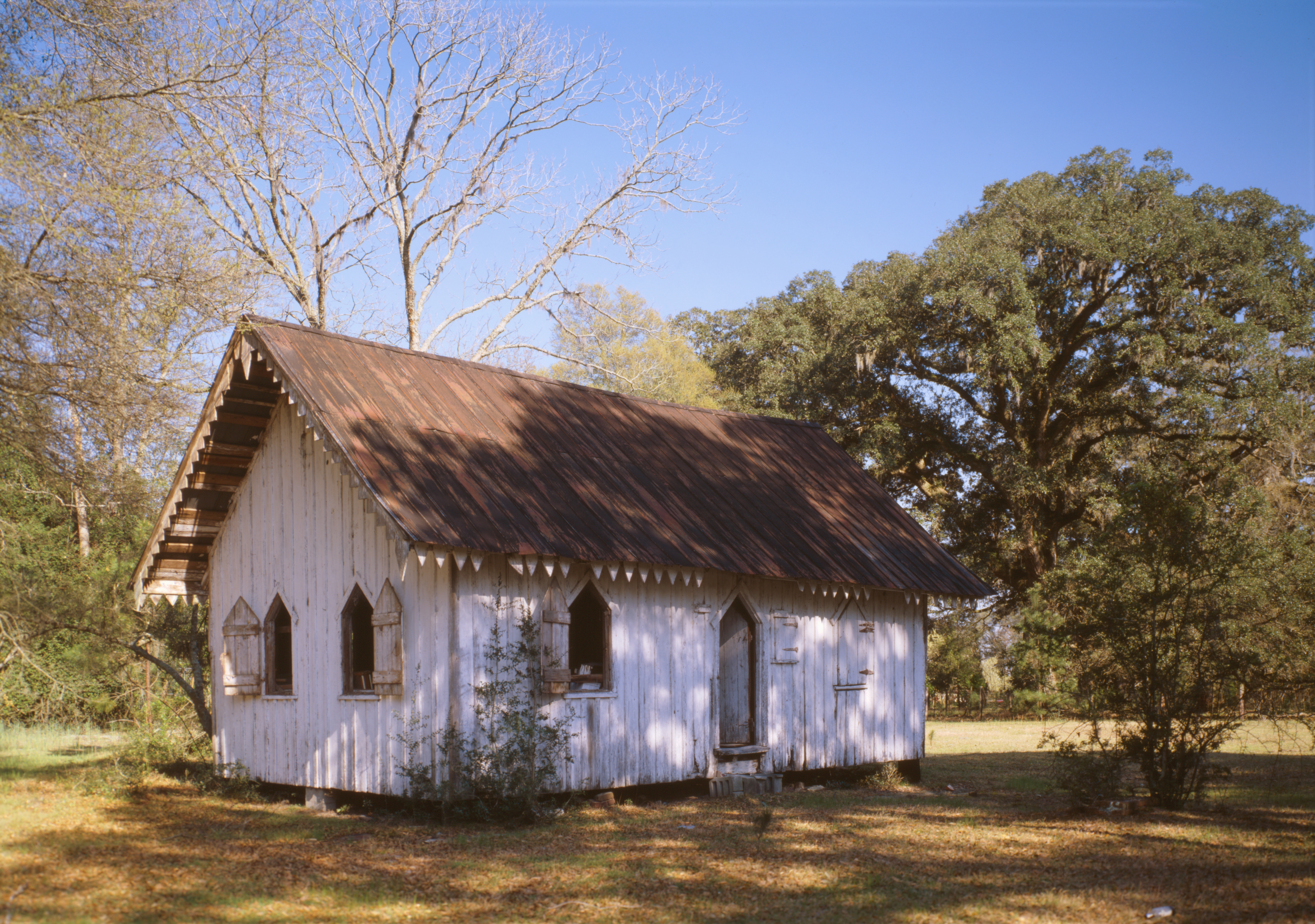
Slave cabin, Arundel Plantation, Georgetown County, South Carolina

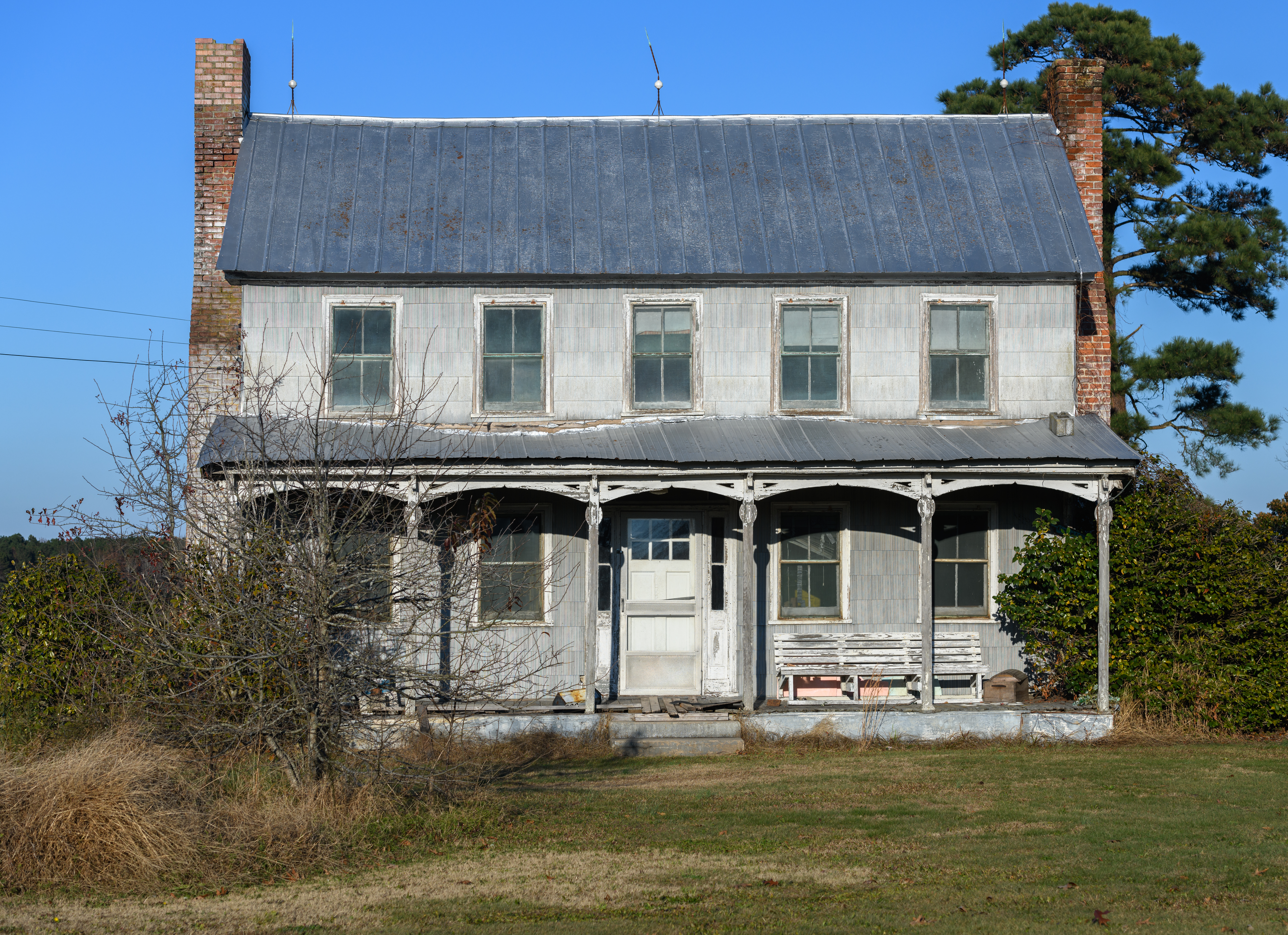
An abandoned and decaying example of Southern American rural vernacular architecture commonly seen in the 1800s and 1900s, surviving well into the 21st century

=== South America ===
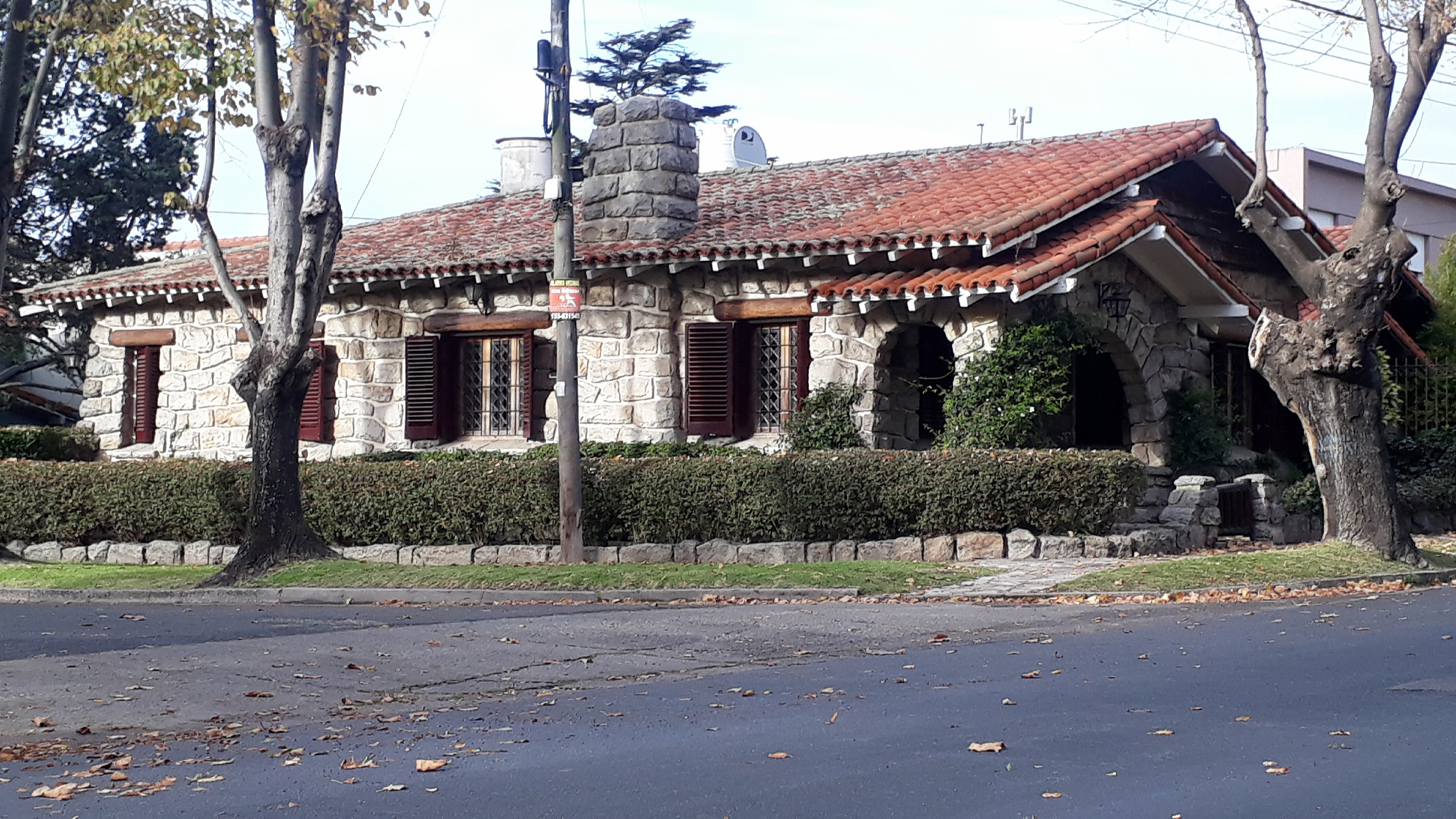
A Mar del Plata style chalet, with its traditional coating of locally extracted orthoquartzite in Mar del Plata, Argentina

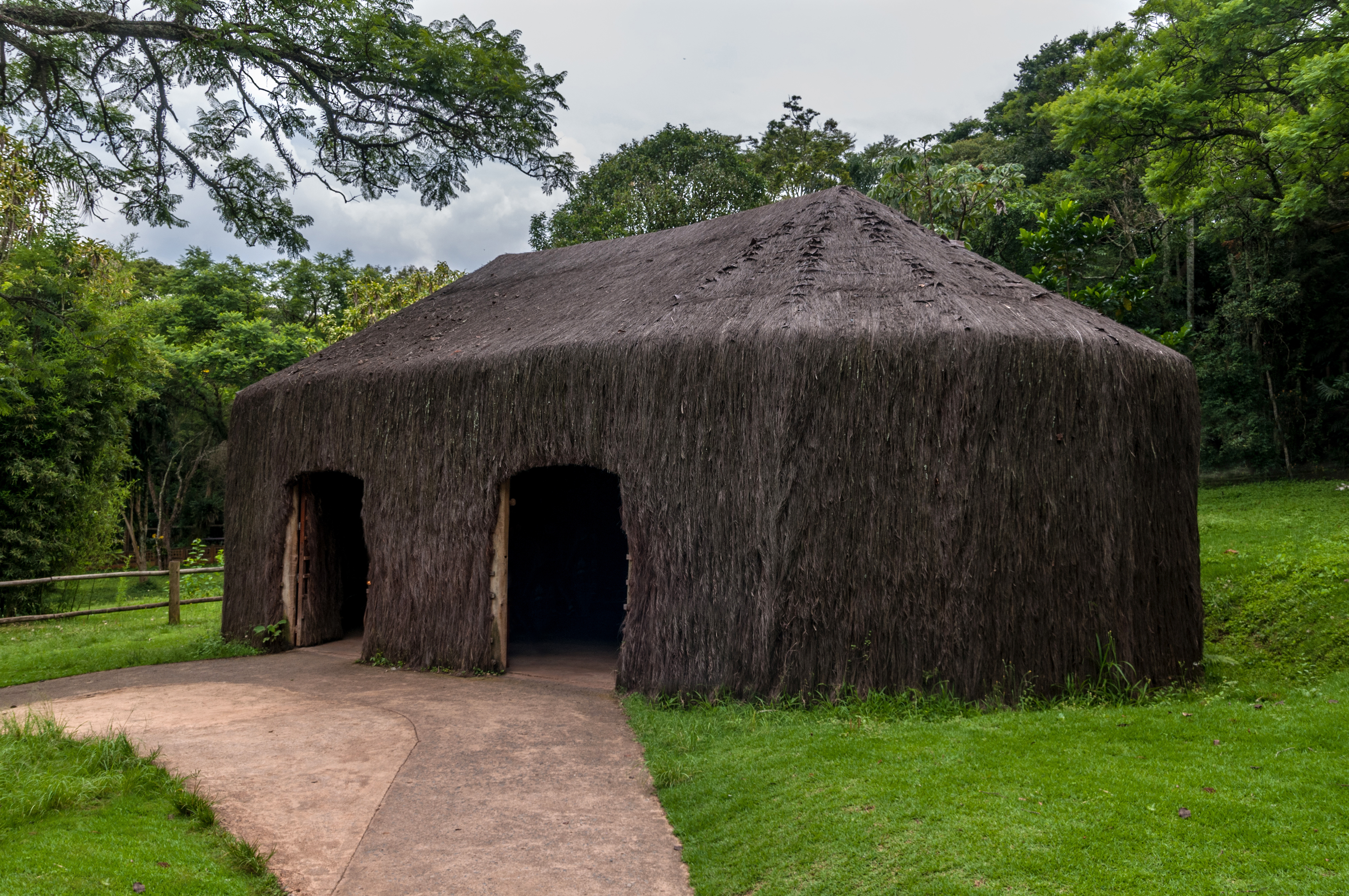
Oca, a communal house typical of the indigenous people of Brazil

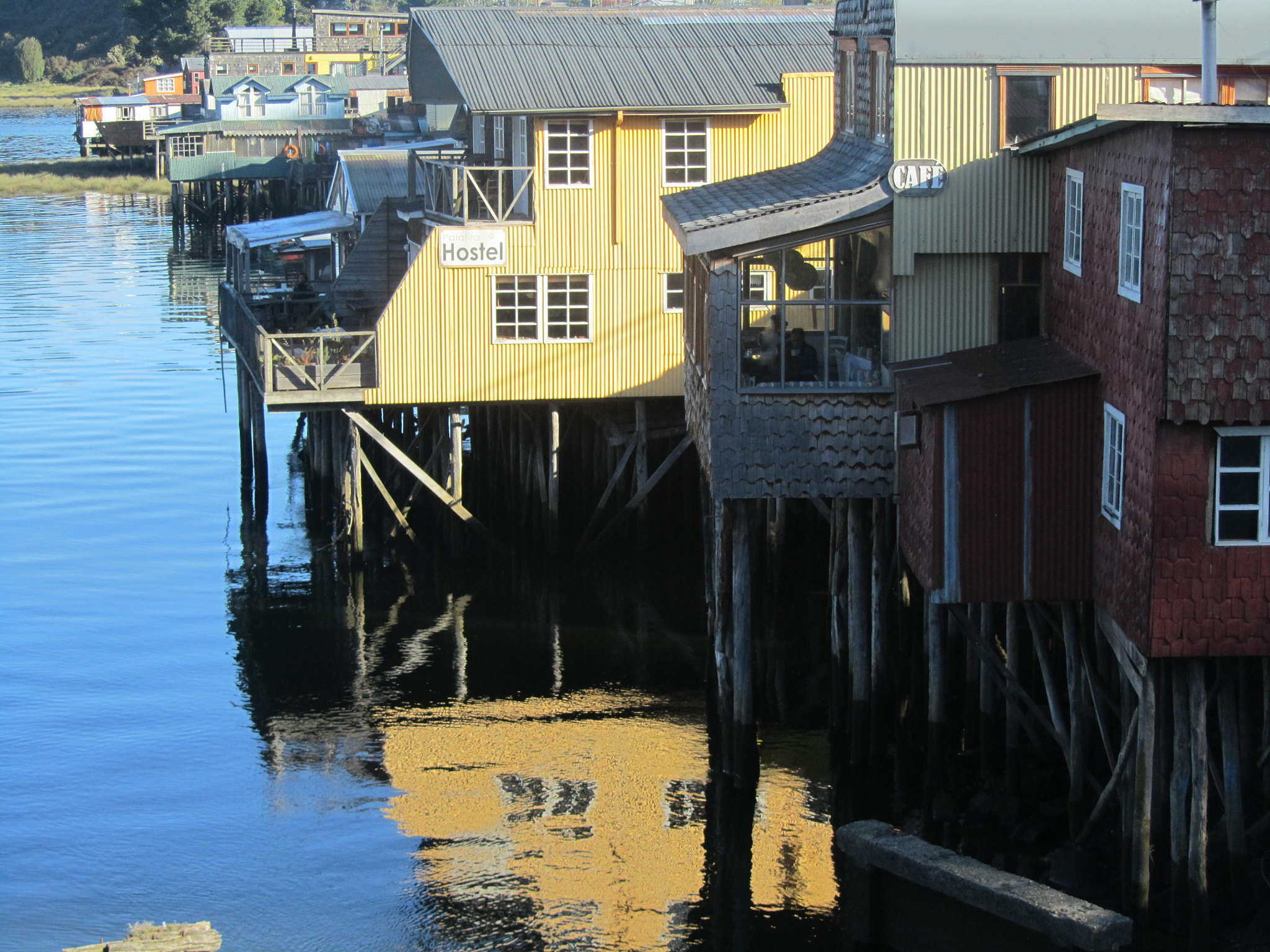
Palafitos in Castro, Chiloé Island, Chile

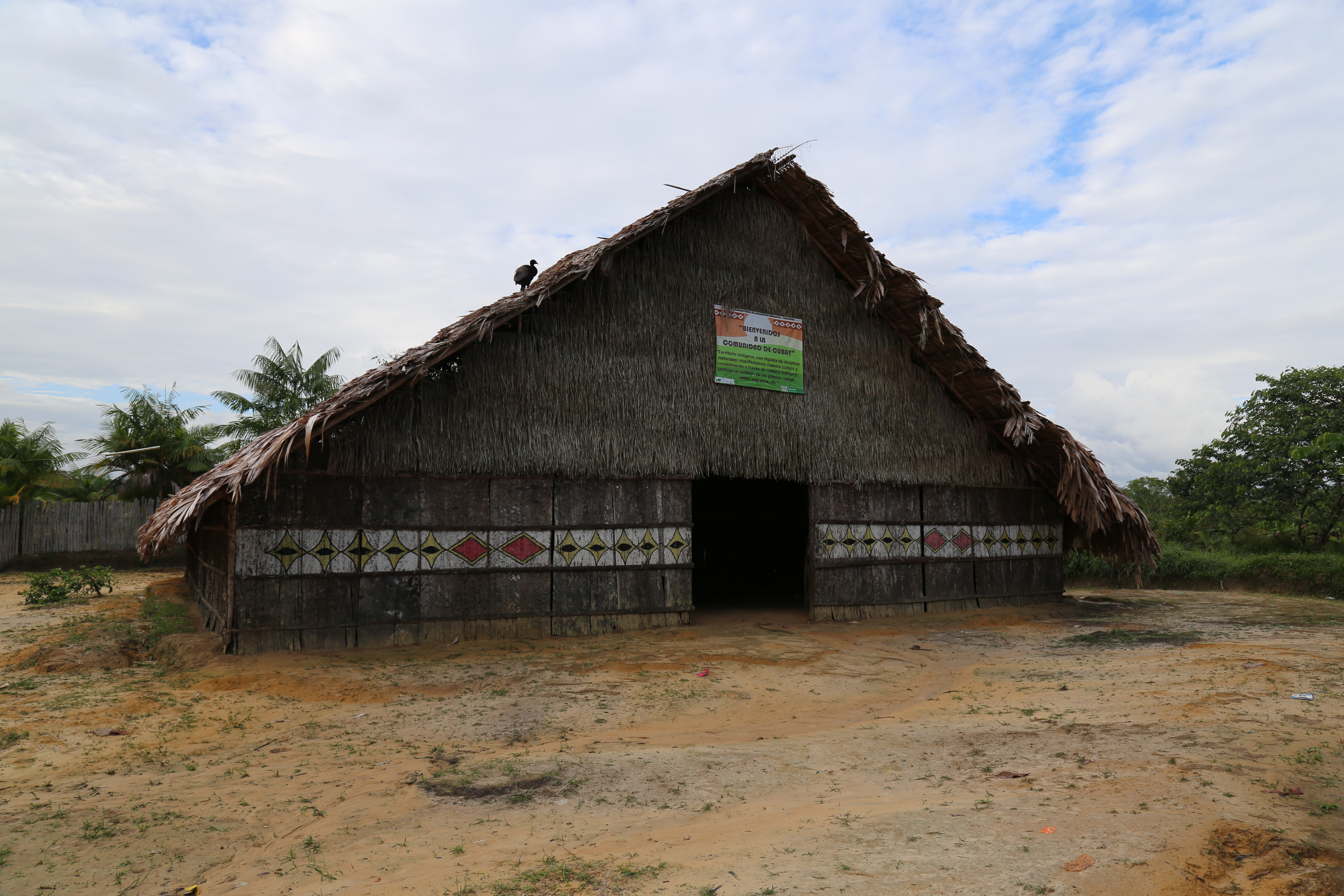
A maloca, typical of the indigenous peoples of the Amazon Rainforest

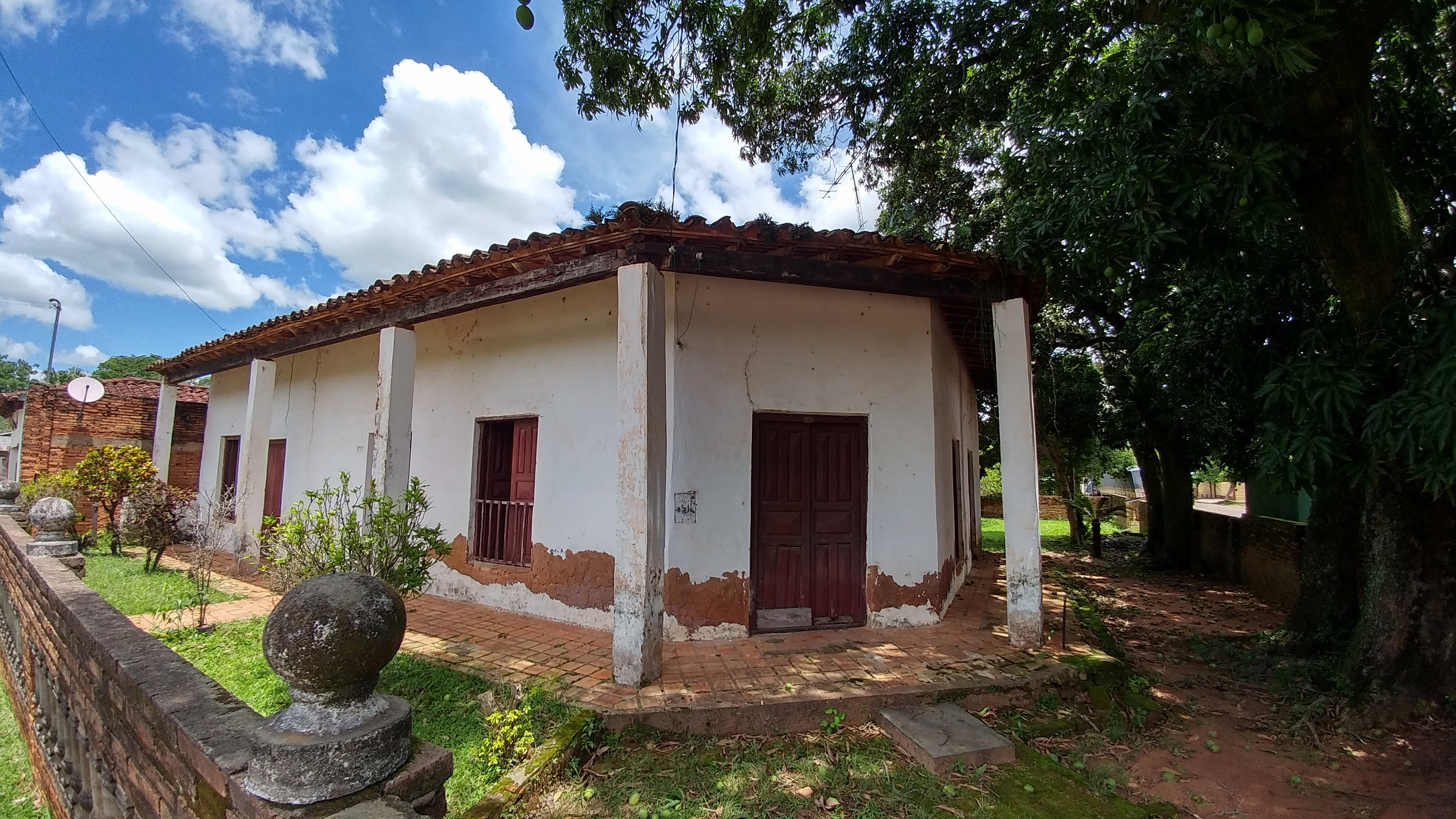
An old house in San Salvador, El Salvador

== See also ==
- Indigenous architecture
- Traditional architecture

House types:

- A-frame house
- Barabara (Aleut)
- Bastle house (England, Scotland)
- Beehive house (Bantu, Africa)
- Bender tent
- Blackhouse
- Bothy
- Bungalow
- Burdei (Romania, Ukraine)
- Cabana
- Chalet (Alpine regions of Europe)
- Clochán (Ireland)
- Cruck house
- Earth lodge (American Indian)
- Four room house (ancient Israel and Judah)
- Gulf house (East Frisia and North Germany)
- Hall house
- Hut
- Icelandic turf house
- Igloo
- Khmer house
- List of house types
- List of human habitation forms
- Log cabin
- Longhouse
- Low German house
- Machiya – Japan
- Malay houses – traditional houses of Bahasa people of Malaya
- Mitato (Greece)
- Mountain hut
- Mudhif
- Nakamal (Vanuatu)
- Nipa hut (Philippines)
- Oast house
- Oca (Brazil)
- Old Frisian farmhouse (the Netherlands and North German Plain)
- Orri (France)
- Peel tower (England, Scotland)
- The Queenslander (Australia)
- Rondavel (Central and South Africa)
- Rumoh Aceh – indigenous architecture of Aceh, Indonesia
- Sheiling
- Shotgun house
- Sod house
- Stilt house
- Tipi
- Torogan (Philippines)
- Tower house (Scotland, Spain and mountainous regions)
- Trullo
- Wharenui – a Māori longhouse (New Zealand)
- Wigwam
- Yaranga
- Yurt (Central Asia)

Architectural elements

- Dormer window
- Mashrabiya (also known as shanashel in Iraq)
- Oriel window
- Windcatcher (bad girs in Arabic)
- Witch window

Building techniques and materials:

- Bundwerk – construction method used in Austria, Tyrol and Bavaria
- Cob
- Grouted roof
- Half-timbered construction
- Pierrotage (French infill material)
- Sod roof
- Stilts
- Thatch
- Veranda (Australia)
- Wattle and daub

Organizations:

- Architecture, SUST
- International Network for Traditional Building, Architecture & Urbanism

Regional vernacular architecture:

- Baita – Alpine regions of Europe
- Balinese architecture – Bali, Indonesia
- Batak architecture – indigenous architecture of the people of Sumatra, Indonesia
- Creole architecture in the United States
- English vernacular architecture
- Estonian vernacular architecture
- European medieval architecture in North America
- Indian vernacular architecture
- Kanak traditional architecture
- Mar del Plata style
- Scottish Vernacular
- Shophouse (South-East Asia)
- Traditional architecture of Enggano (Indonesia)
- Vernacular architecture in Indonesia
- Rustic architecture of the United States
- Vernacular architecture of the Carpathians
- Vernacular architecture of old Riyadh (Saudi Arabia)
- Vernacular architecture in Norway
- Vernacular architecture of Ukraine
- Vernacular residential architecture of Western Sichuan
- Vernacular architecture of Spain

People:

- Laurie Baker
- Geoffrey Bawa
- Rifat Chadirji
- Bashirul Haq
- Saiful Haq
- Friedensreich Hundertwasser
- Howard Moffitt
- Mudéjar
- Dan Phillips
- Kea Tawana

== Sources and further reading ==
- Alcock, N. W. (2003), "Vernacular architecture [Folk architecture]", Grove Art Online, Oxford University Press, doi:10.1093/gao/9781884446054.article.t088875, ISBN 978-1-884446-05-4
- Bourgeois, Jean-Louis (1983). Spectacular vernacular: a new appreciation of traditional desert architecture. Salt Lake City: Peregrine Smith Books. ISBN 0-87905-144-2. Large format.
- Brunskill, R.W. (2006) [1985]. Traditional Buildings of Britain: An Introduction to Vernacular Architecture. Cassell's. ISBN 0-304-36676-5.
- Brunskill, R.W. (2000) [1971]. Illustrated Handbook of Vernacular Architecture (4th ed.). London: Faber and Faber. ISBN 0-571-19503-2.
- Clifton-Taylor, Alec (1987) [1972]. The Pattern of English Building. London: Faber and Faber. ISBN 0-571-13988-4. Clifton-Taylor pioneered the study of the English vernacular.
- Fox, Sir Cyril; Raglan, Lord (1954). Renaissance Houses. Monmouthshire Houses. Vol. III. Cardiff: Amgueddfa Cymru – Museum Wales.
- Glassie, Henry. "Architects, Vernacular Traditions, and Society" Traditional Dwellings and Settlements Review, Vol 1, 1990, 9-21
- Holden, Timothy G; Baker, Louise M (2004). The Blackhouses of Arnol. Edinburgh: Historic Scotland. ISBN 1-904966-03-9.
- Holden, Timothy G (2003). "Brotchie's Steading (Dunnet parish), iron age and medieval settlement; post-medieval farm". Discovery and Excavation in Scotland (4): 85–86.
- Holm, Ivar (2006). 2006 [Ideas and Beliefs in Architecture and Industrial design: How attitudes, orientations, and underlying assumptions shape the built environment]. Oslo School of Architecture and Design. ISBN 82-547-0174-1.
- Mark Jarzombek, Architecture of First Societies: A Global Perspective, (New York: Wiley & Sons, August 2013)
- Oliver, Paul (2003). Dwellings. London: Phaidon Press. ISBN 0-7148-4202-8.
- Oliver, Paul, ed. (1997). Encyclopedia of Vernacular Architecture of the World. Vol. 1. Cambridge University Press. ISBN 978-0-521-58269-8.
- Perez Gil, Javier (2016). ¿Que es la arquitectura vernacula? Historia y concepto de un patrimonio cultural especifico. Valladolid: Universidad de Valladolid. ISBN 978-84-8448-862-0.
- Pruscha, Carl, ed. (2005) [2004]. [Himalayan Vernacular]. Köln: Verlag Der Buchhandlung Walther König. ISBN 3-85160-038-X. Carl Pruscha, Austrian architect and United Nations-UNESCO advisor to the government of Nepal, lived and worked in the Himalayas 1964–74. He continued his activities as head of the design studio "Habitat, Environment and Conservation" at the Academy of Fine Arts in Vienna.
- Rudofsky, Bernard (1987) [1964]. Architecture Without Architects: A Short Introduction to Non-Pedigreed Architecture. Albuquerque: University of New Mexico Press. ISBN 0-8263-1004-4.
- Rudofsky, Bernard (1969). Streets for People: A Primer for Americans. Garden City, NY: Doubleday. ISBN 0-385-04231-0.
- Schittich, Christian, ed. (2019). Vernacular Architecture: Atlas for Living Throughout the World. Basle: Birkhäuser. ISBN 978-3-0356-1631-6
- Upton, Dell and John Michael Vlach, eds. Common Places: Readings in American Vernacular Architecture. Athens, Georgia: University of Georgia Press, 1986. ISBN 0-8203-0749-1.
- Wharton, David. "Roadside Architecture." Southern Spaces, 1 February 2005, archived
- William, Eurwyn (2010). The Welsh Cottage. Royal Commission on the Ancient and Historical Monuments of Wales. ISBN 978-1-871184-426.
