= Vrouwenparochie =

Vrouwenparochie Froubuurt
- Village
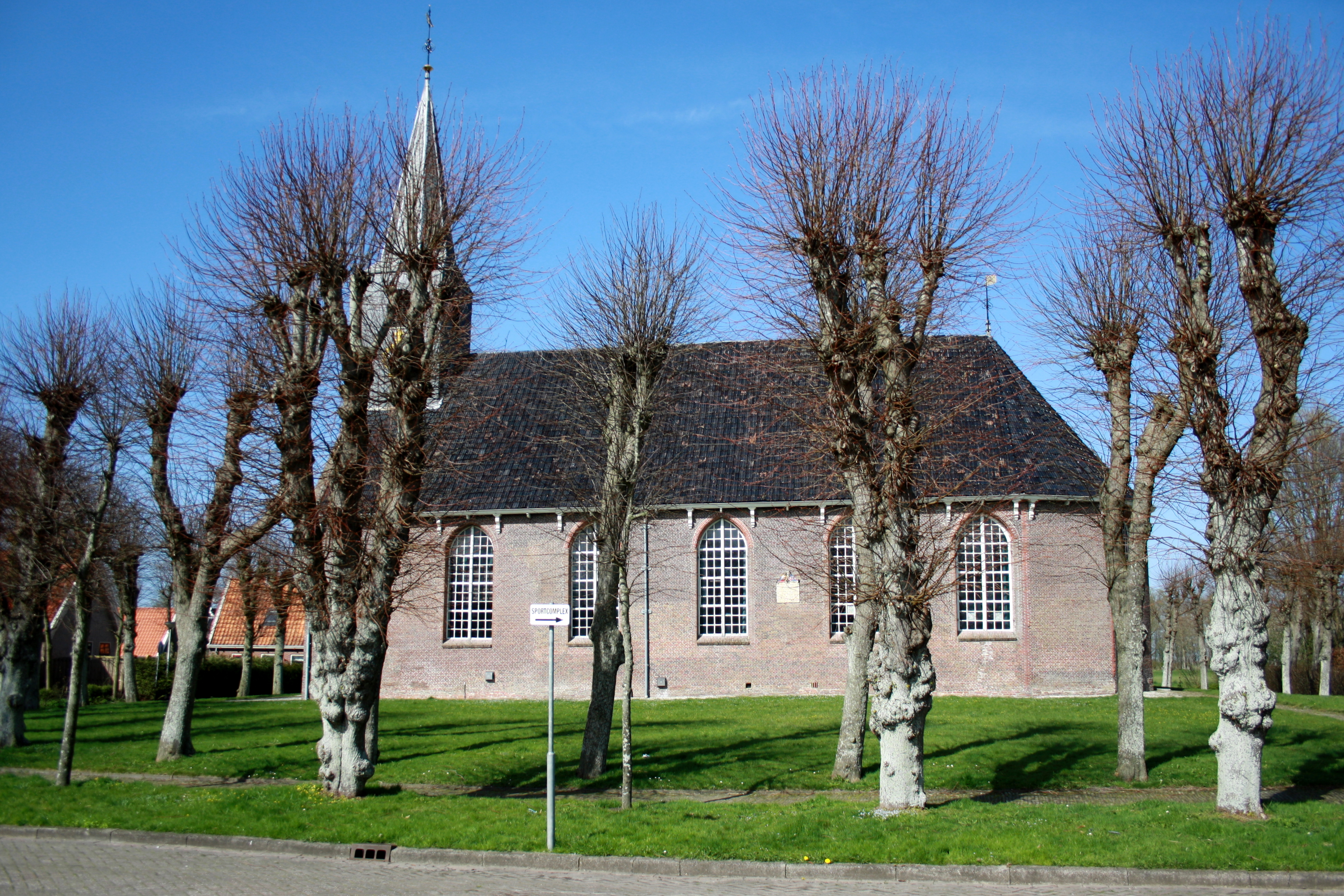
- Vrouwenparochie church

- Flag Coat of arms

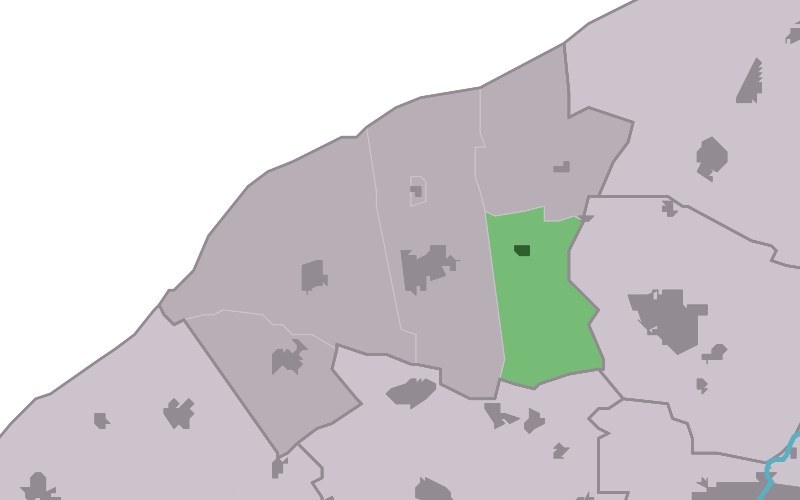
- Location in het Bildt municipality

- Location in the Netherlands Vrouwenparochie (Netherlands)
- Country: Netherlands
- Province: Friesland
- Municipality: Waadhoeke

Area
  - Total: 12.92 km^{2} (4.99 sq mi)
- Elevation: 0.7 m (2.3 ft)

Population (2021)
  - Total: 685
  - Density: 53.0/km^{2} (137/sq mi)
- Time zone: UTC+1 (CET)
  - Summer (DST): UTC+2 (CEST)
- Postal code: 9077
- Dialing code: 0518

Vrouwenparochie (Dutch: [ˈvrʌuə(m)paːˌrɔxi]; Bildts: Froubuurt; West Frisian: Froubuorren) is a village in Waadhoeke municipality in the province of Friesland, the Netherlands, with a population of around 685 in 2021.

It is called Froubuurt in the dialect of Het Bildt. There is a restored windmill in the village, De Vrouwbuurstermolen.

== History ==
The village was founded in 1505 in the new land of het Bildt after the Middelzee was poldered.

The village was first mentioned in 1570 Kijfhueck, parochie o.l. frovwen, and means "parish of Our Sweet Lady (=Mary, mother of Jesus)" who was the protector of the village. In the early days, the village was known as Kijfhoek, after the eponymous village of the earliest settlers.

In 1504, a deal was struck between George, Duke of Saxony and four noblemen from Holland to polder the Middelzee. Each group of settlers had to select a patron saint. In 1505, the dike was constructed. The same year, the middelweg was built as an east-west connection through the new land of het Bildt. Vrouwenparochie developed along the road (nowadays: N393) as a linear settlement.

The Dutch Reformed church was built in 1670 as a replacement of the early 16th century church.

The grist mill De Vrouwbuurstermolen is a wind mill which was built before 1832. It was decommissioned in 1954. It was restored between 1963 and 1967, and is regularly in use.

Vrouwenparochie was home to 1,202 people in 1840. There was a railway station in the village between 1902 and 1940. The building burned down in 1999, and was demolished in 2002.

Before 2018, the village was part of het Bildt municipality.

== Notable people ==
- Johan Bouma (born 1940), soil scientist

== Gallery ==
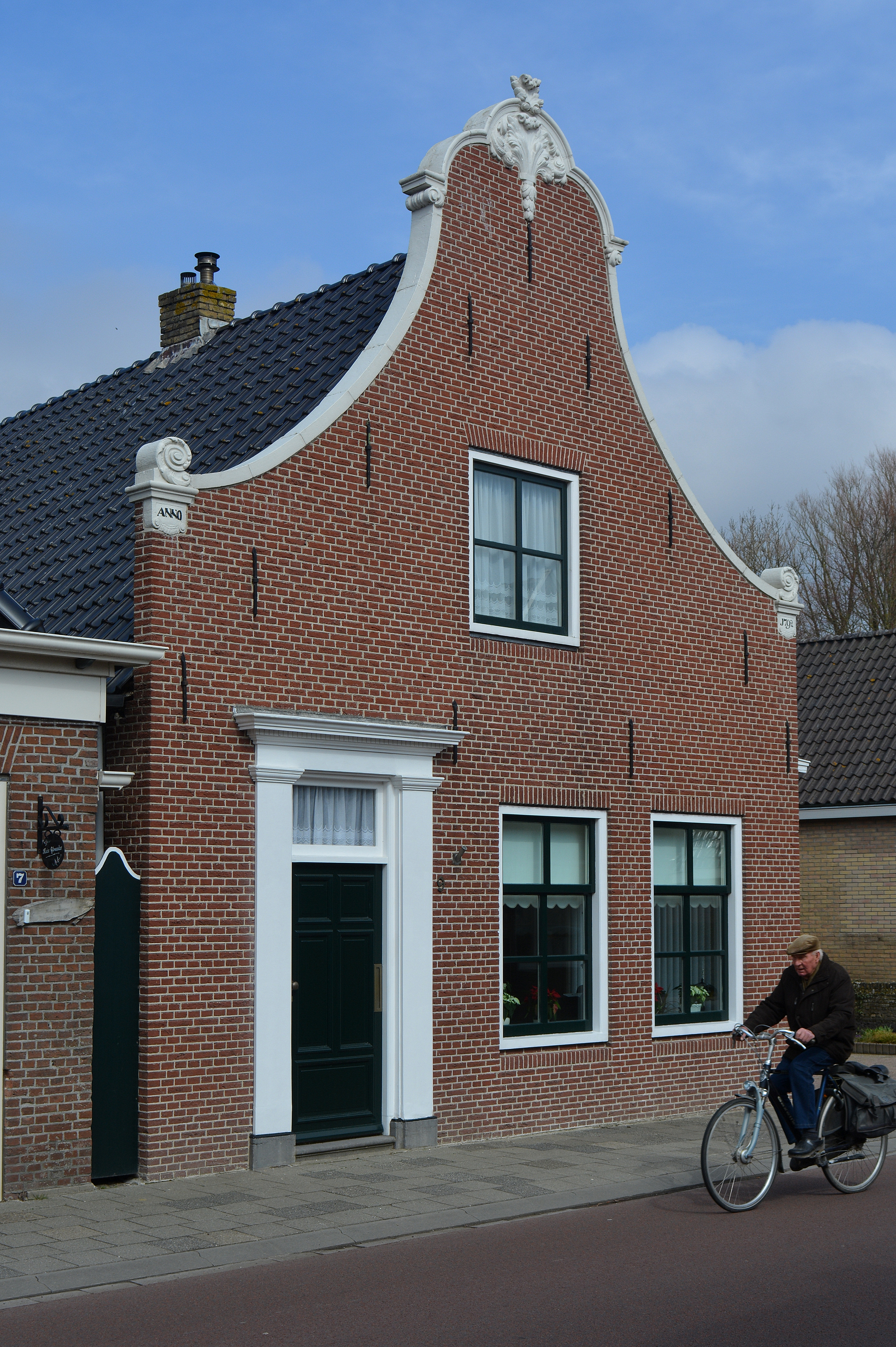
House in Vrouwenparochie

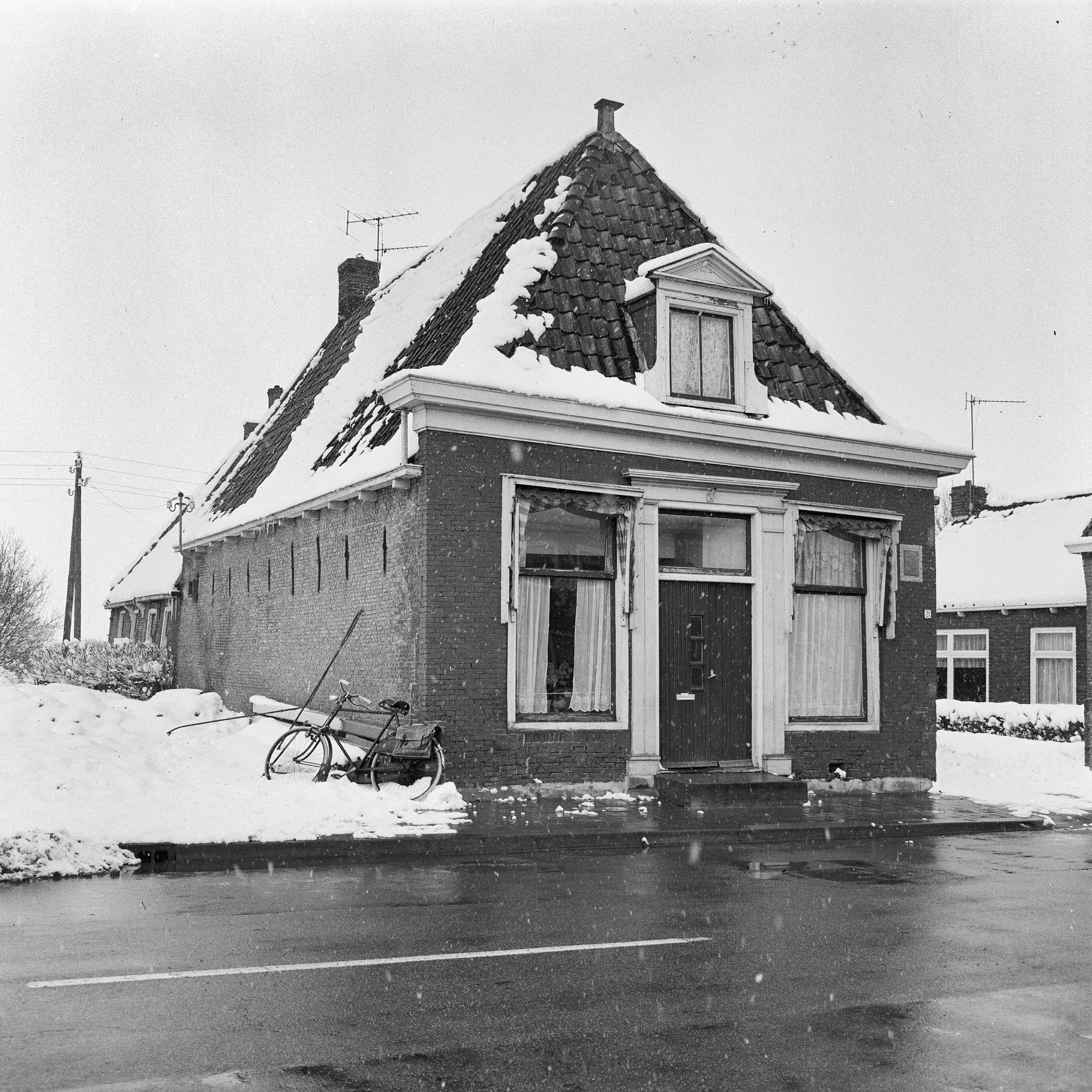
House in winter (1971)

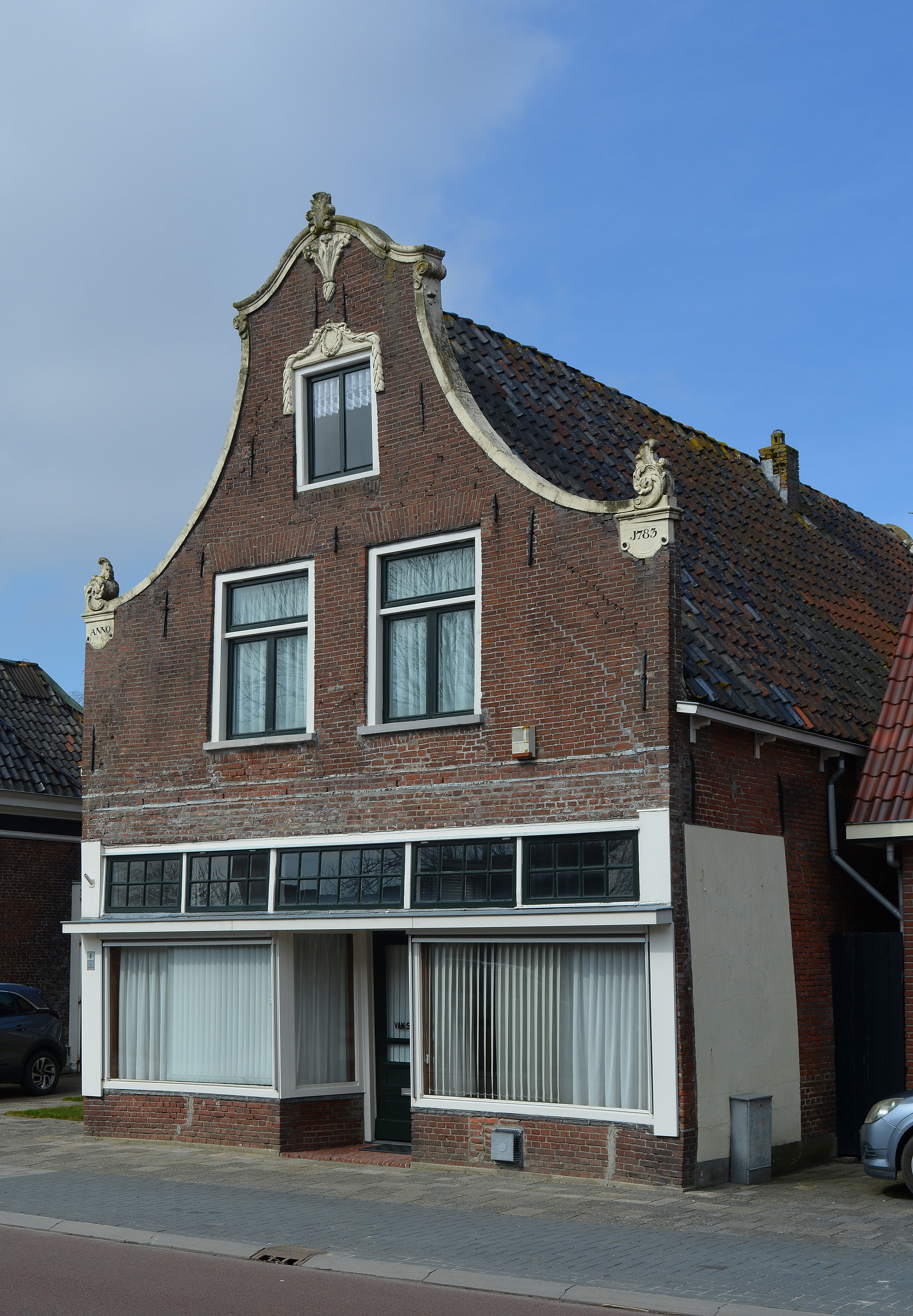
House in Vrouwenparochie

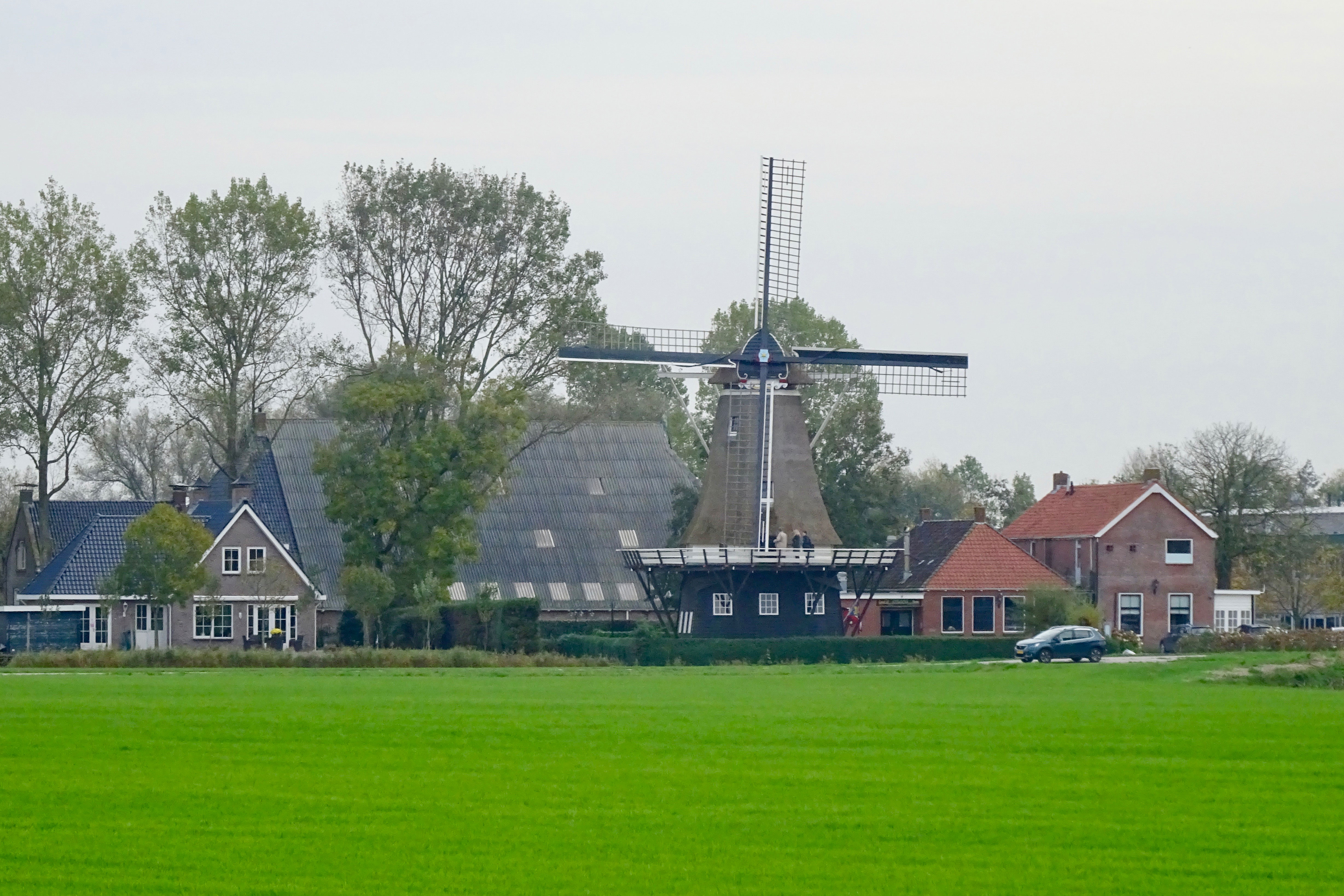
Vrouwbuurstermolen
