= Eanjum =

- Village
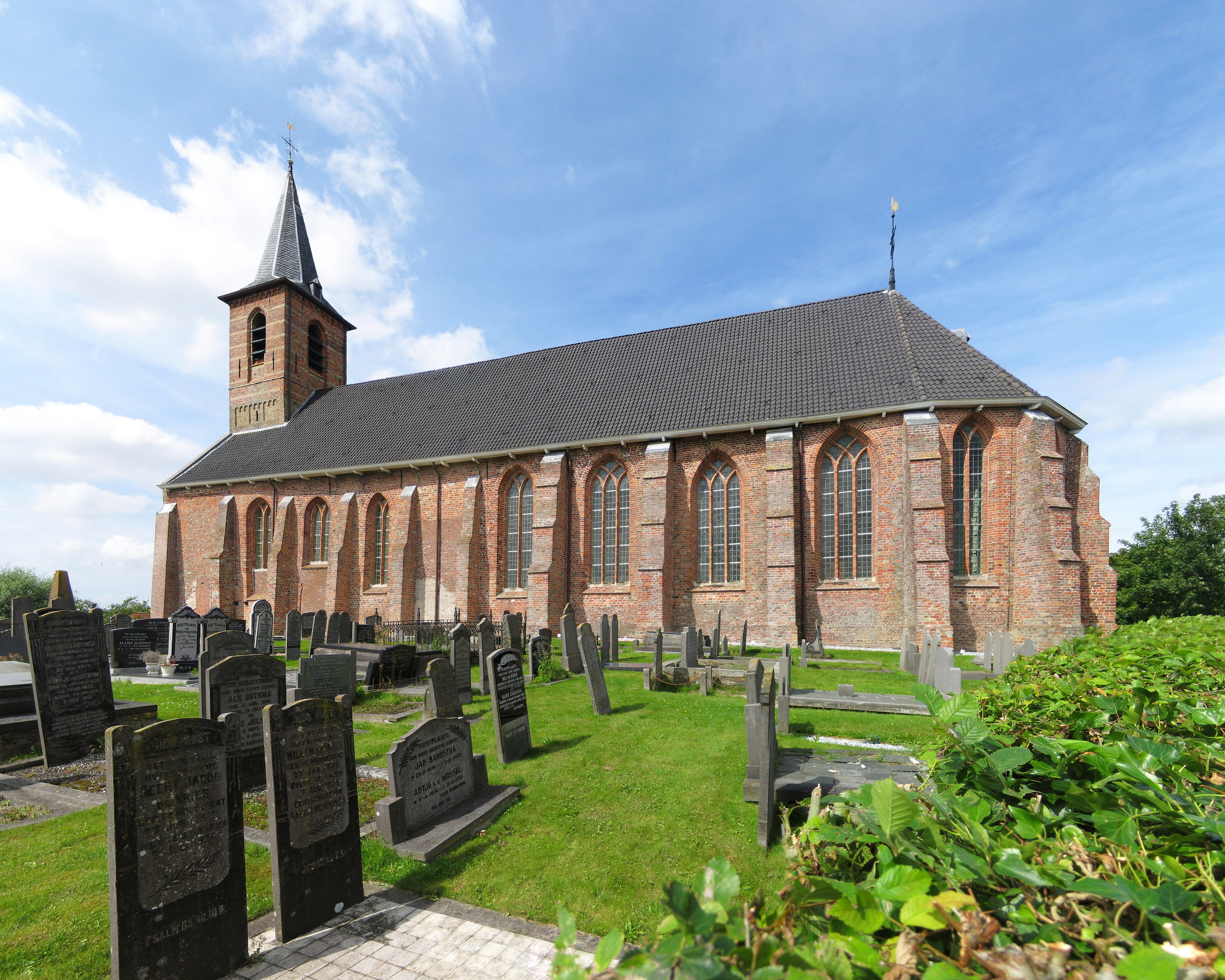
- The 12th-century Protestant church of Eanjum (2008)

- Flag Coat of arms

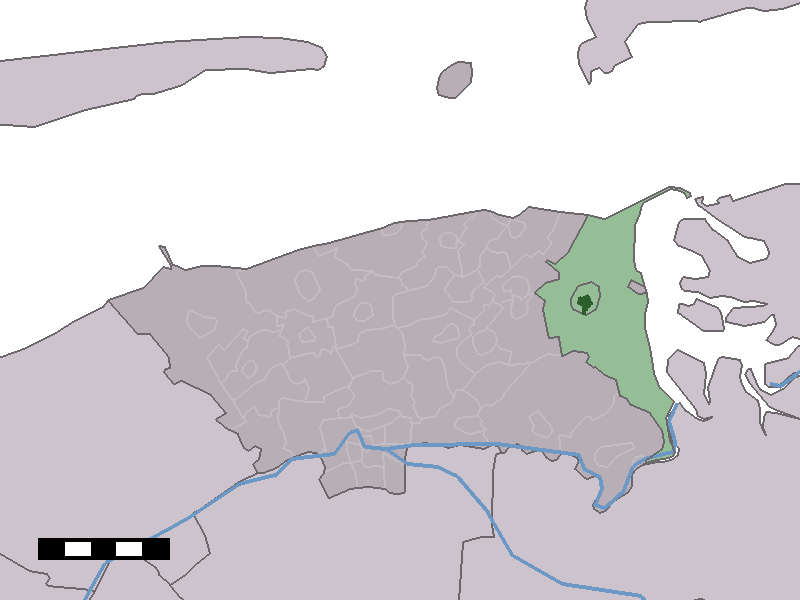
- Location in the former Dongeradeel municipality

- Location in the Netherlands Eanjum (Netherlands)
- Country: Netherlands
- Province: Friesland
- Municipality: Noardeast-Fryslân

Area
  - Total: 19.75 km^{2} (7.63 sq mi)
- Elevation: 0.3 m (0.98 ft)

Population (2021)
  - Total: 1,070
  - Density: 54.2/km^{2} (140/sq mi)
- Time zone: UTC+1 (CET)
  - Summer (DST): UTC+2 (CEST)
- Postal code: 9133
- Dialing code: 0519

Eanjum (Dutch: Anjum) is a village in the Dutch province of Friesland. It is located in the municipality Noardeast-Fryslân and had, as of January 2017, a population of 1136.

== History ==
The village was first mentioned in 944 as Anigheim, and means "settlement of the people of Ane". Eanjum was a terp (artificial living mound) with a radial structure which probably dated several centuries Before Christ. Until the 15th century, it was the seat of the grietenij (predecessor of a municipality).

The Dutch Reformed church has 12th century elements and was enlarged in the 13th and 15th century. In 1681, the tower collapsed during a storm and destroyed the roof, and was rebuilt in 1684. In 1516, a flood destroyed most of the village. The All Saints' Flood of 1570 claimed 1,801 victims in the Dongeradeel grietenij.

The Holdinga State was a castle which was first mentioned in 1511. Wilcke van Holdinga, the owner during the Dutch Revolt fled to Emden and when he returned in 1595, he ordered the reconstruction of his castle which was probably destroyed by the Spanish. During the 18th century, the castle started to become derelict. It was sold in 1831, and demolished and reused as building material.

In 1840, Eanjum was home to 976 people. From 1913 to 1935 Eanjum was the terminus of the North Friesland Railway. The railway station building still exists.

The grist mill De Eendracht, Anjum was built in 1889 after the previous mill was struck by lightning and burnt down. It was in use until 1964, and period of decay set in. In 1967, it was sold to the municipality and is used by the local tourist agency. The wind mill usually operates on Saturday.

Before 2019, the village was part of the Dongeradeel municipality.

The village's official name was changed from Anjum to Eanjum in 2023.

== Gallery ==
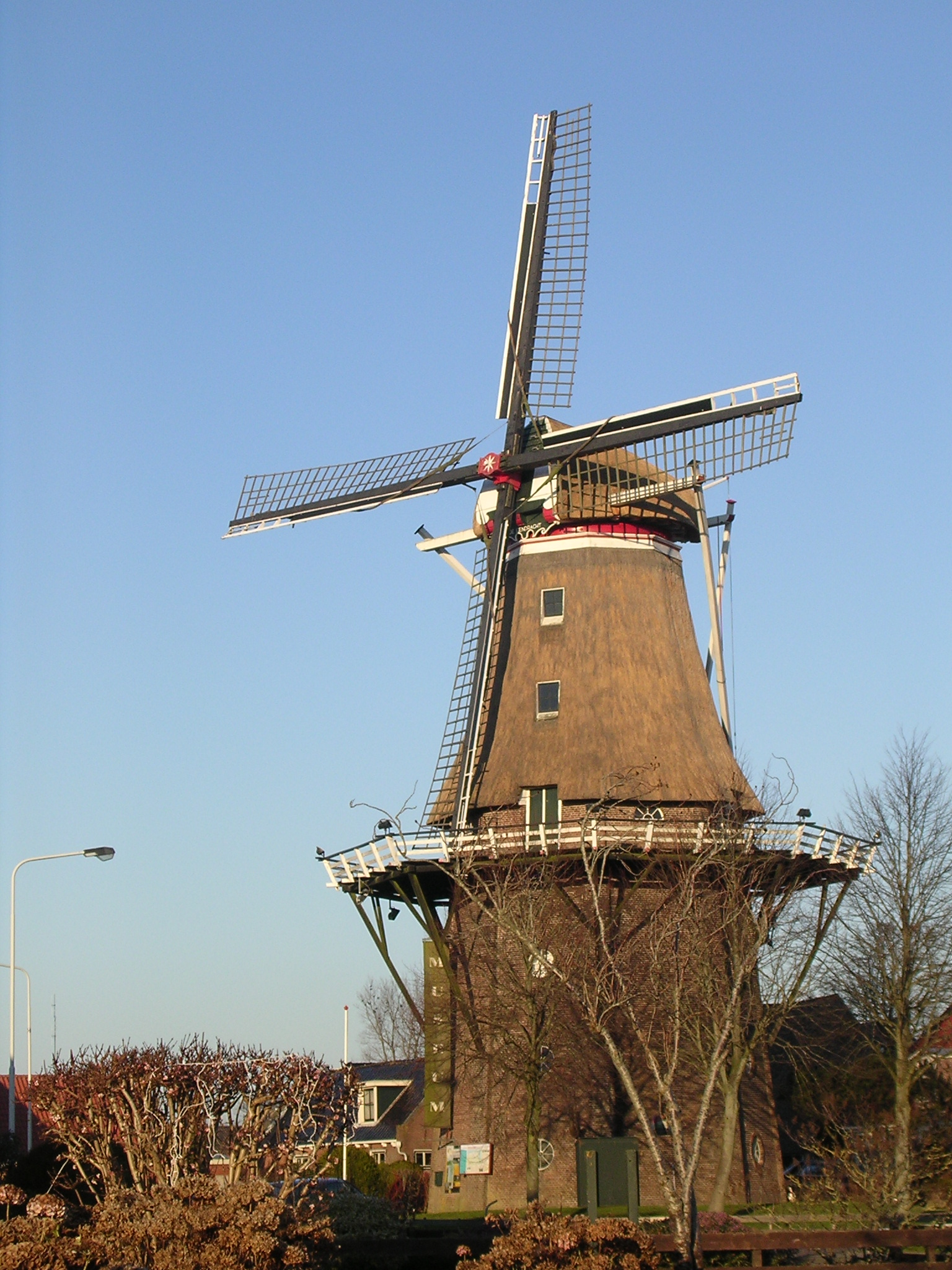
Windmill De Eendracht

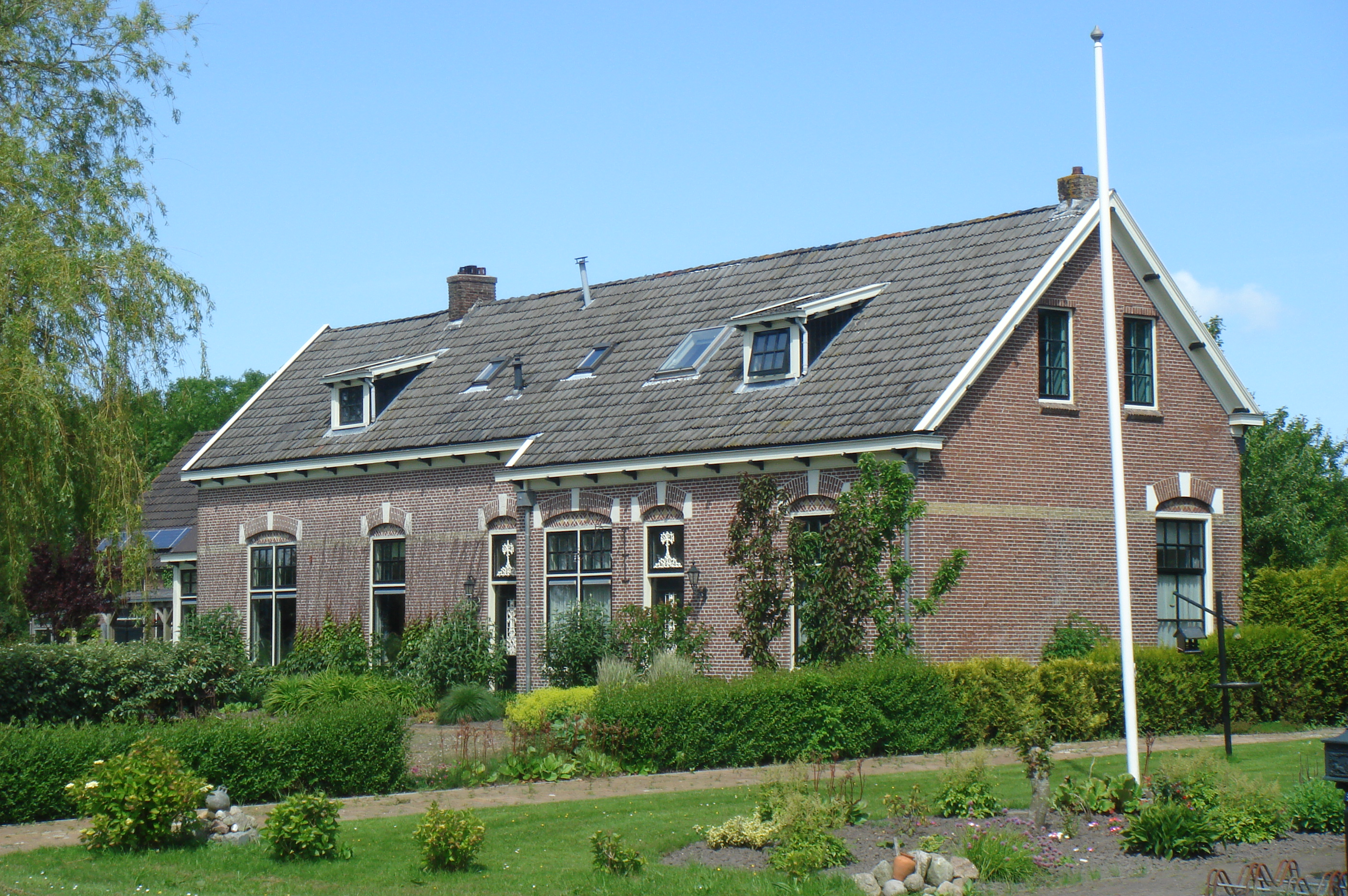
Former railway station now residential home

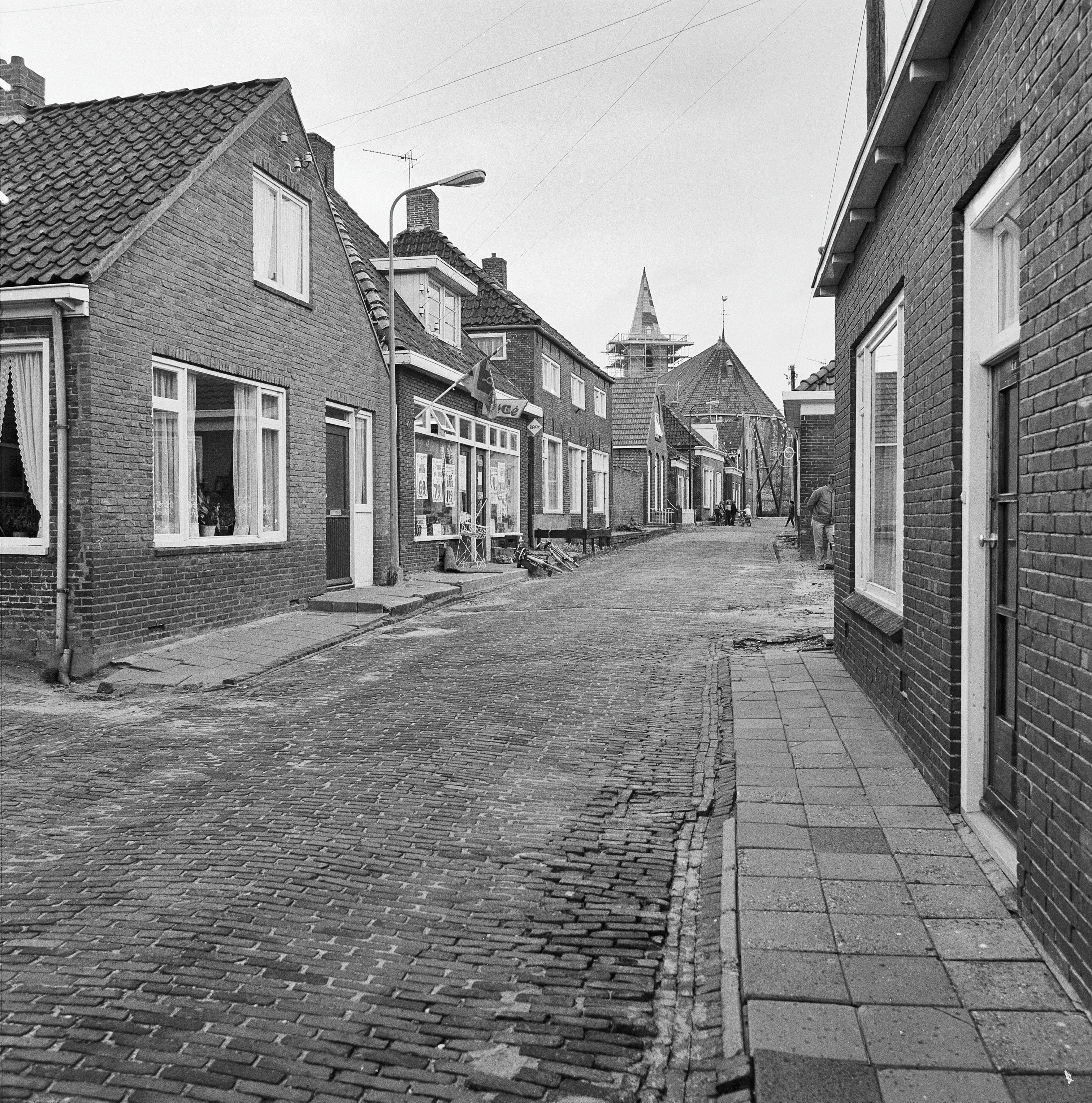
Street view (1973)

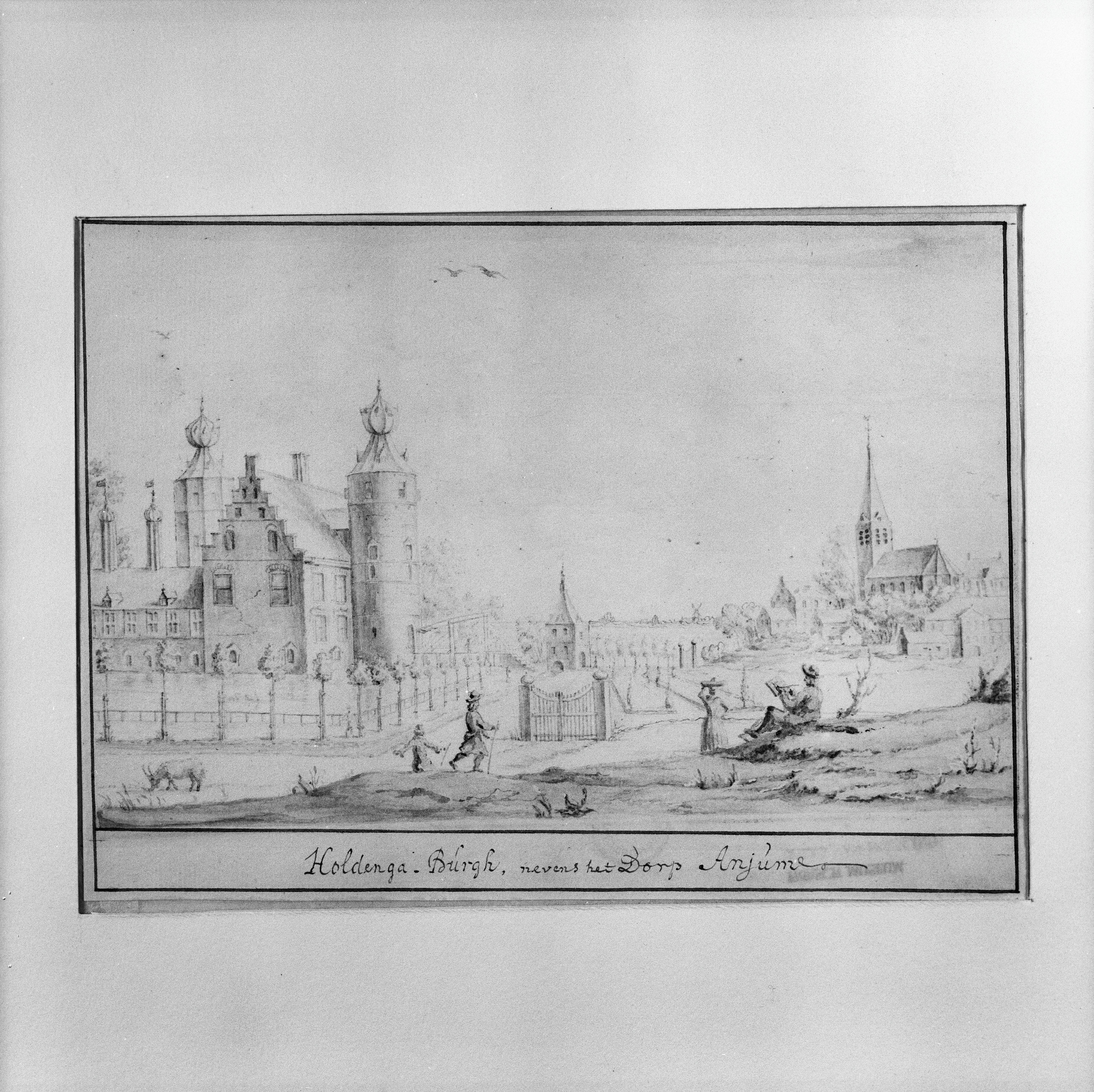
Drawing of Eanjum with Holdinga State
