= De Vrouwbuurstermolen =

Historic building in the Netherlands

De Vrouwbuurstermolen, Vrouwenparochie
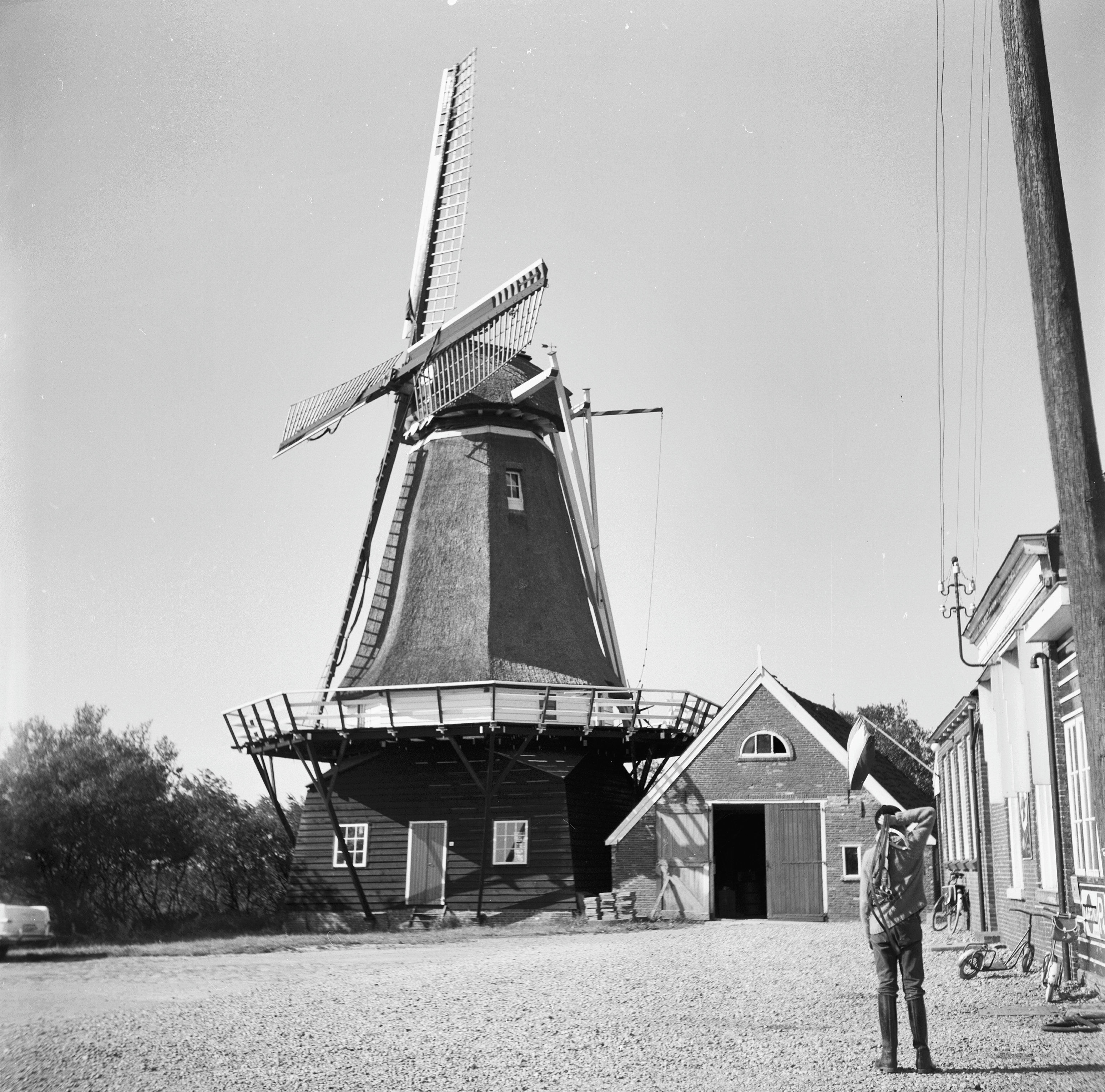
- De Vrouwbuurstermolen, June 1968

Origin
- Mill name: De Vrouwbuurstermolen
- Mill location: Middelweg 6, 9077 SB, Vrouwenparochie
- Coordinates: 53°16′51″N 5°43′18″E
- Operator(s): Stichting De Vrouwbuurstermolen
- Year built: 1862

Information
- Purpose: Corn mill, formerly also a pearl barley mill
- Type: Smock mill
- Storeys: Two storey smock
- Base storeys: Two storey base
- Smock sides: Eight sides
- No. of sails: Four sails
- Type of sails: Common sails
- Windshaft: Cast iron
- Winding: Tailpole and winch
- No. of pairs of millstones: Two pairs
- Size of millstones: 1.50 metres (4 ft 11 in)

De Vrouwbuurstermolen is a smock mill in Vrouwenparochie, Friesland, Netherlands which was built in 1862 and is in working order. The mill is listed as a Rijksmonument.

== History ==
Little is known of the early history of the mill. A mill stood here in 1570. It was almost certainly a post mill. A rye mill was marked on a map dated 1832. This was a smock mill. De Vrouwbuurstermolen was built on the base of this mill in 1862. The mill was owned by Johannes Jans van der Ley in 1869. The mill was then a corn and pearl barley mill. The mill worked until 1954. At that time, it was fitted with a secondhand pair of sails with leading edges on the Dekker system. These sails were shorter than the other pair, having been acquired secondhand from a demolished drainage mill. They had a span of less than 19.00 metres (62 ft 4 in). In 1962, a society was formed to restore the mill. Restoration took place from 1963 to 1967. The mill gas worked regularly since then. A further restoration in 2007 saw the mill fitted with a sprinkler system in case of fire. The mill is listed as a Rijksmonument, No. 9526.

== Description ==
De Vrouwbuurstermolen is what the Dutch describe as a "Stellingmolen". It is a smock mill on a wooden base. The stage is 4.90 metres (16 ft 1 in) above ground level. The smock and cap are thatched. The mill is winded by tailpole and winch. The sails are Common sails. They have a span of 20.60 metres (67 ft 7 in). The sails are carried on a cast-iron windshaft. The windshaft also carries the wooden brake wheel, which has 56 cogs. This drives the wallower (29 cogs) at the top of the upright shaft. At the bottom of the upright shaft is the great spur wheel, which has 88 cogs. The great spur wheel drives two pair of French Burr millstones via lantern pinion stone nuts which have 22 staves each. Both pairs of millstones are 1.50 metres (4 ft 11 in) diameter.

== Millers ==
- Johannes Jans van der Ley (1869- )

References for above:-

== Public access ==
De Vrouwbuurstermolen is open to the public on the first Saturday in the month between 09:00 and 12:00, or by appointment.
