= NS 7100 =

Dutch tank engine series

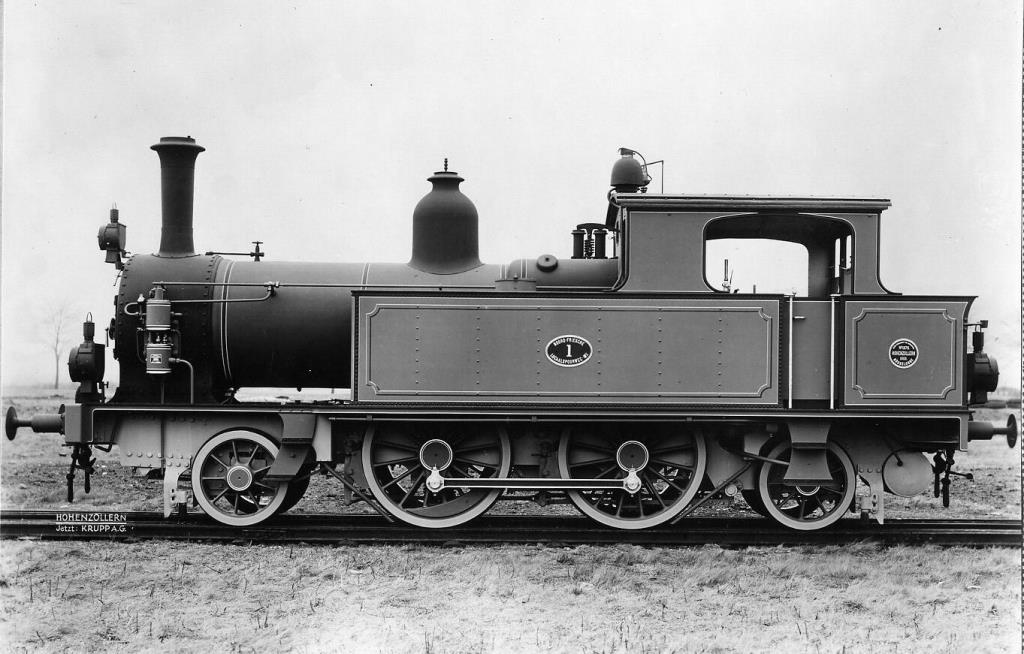
- N.F.L.S No. 1 in 1900.
Type and origin
- Power type: Steam
- Builder: Hohenzollern
- Build date: Series 1: 1901-1902; Series 2: 1907-1908
- Total produced: 25
Specifications
- Configuration
  - Whyte: 2-4-2
  - UIC: 1'B1'
- Gauge: 1,435 mm (4 ft 8 1/2 in)
- Leading dia.: Series 1: 1,000 mm (3 ft 3 in); Series 2: 1,100 mm (3 ft 7 in)
- Driver dia.: Series 1: 1,520 mm (5 ft 0 in); Series 2: 1,540 mm (5 ft 1 in)
- Length: Series 1: 10,220 mm (33 ft 6 in); Series 2: 10,473 mm (34 ft 4.3 in)
- Height: 4,100 mm (13 ft 5 in)
- Loco weight: Series 1: 43.2 t (47.6 short tons; 42.5 long tons); Series 2: 49 t (54 short tons; 48 long tons)
- Fuel type: Coal
- Fuel capacity: 2 t (2.2 short tons; 2.0 long tons)
- Water cap.: Series 1: 4.5 m^{3} (990 imp gal); Series 2: 6 m^{3} (1,300 imp gal)
- Firebox
  - Grate area: 1.42 m^{2} (15.3 sq ft)
- Boiler pressure: Series 1: 12.4 kg/cm^{2} (176 psi); Series 2: 12 kg/cm^{2} (170 psi)
- Cylinders: 2
- Cylinder size: 380 mm × 560 mm (15 in × 22 in)
- Valve gear: Stephenson
Performance figures
- Maximum speed: Series 1: 55 km/h (34 mph) later 80 km/h (50 mph); Series 2: 60 km/h (37 mph) later 80 km/h (50 mph)
- Tractive effort: series 1: 4,620 kgf (10,200 lbf) series 2: 4,410 kgf (9,700 lbf)
Career
- Operators: NS
- Numbers: series 1: NFLS: 1-10, HSM: 1051-1060, NS: 7101-7110 series 2: SS: 531-545, NS: 7111-7125
- Withdrawn: series 1: 1925-1949 series 2: 1947-1948
- Disposition: All scrapped

The NS 7100 was a series of tank engines of the Dutch Railways (NS) and its predecessors Maatschappij tot Exploitatie van Staatsspoorwegen (SS), Hollandsche IJzeren Spoorweg-Maatschappij (HSM) and Noord-Friesche Locaalspoorweg-Maatschappij (NFLS).

== Series NFLS 1-10 / HSM 1051-1061 / NS 7101-7110 ==
At the beginning of the twentieth century, the NFLS ordered ten locomotives for local trains on the Leeuwarden - Stiens - Metslawier, Stiens - Harlingen, and Tzummarum - Franeker Halte lines from the Hohenzollern factory in Düsseldorf-Grafenberg. They were tank engines with the 1'B1' wheel arrangement, the leading axle of which was designed as an Adams axle. The first six locomotives entered service in 1901, followed by the other four in 1902. As of December 1, 1905, the operation of these lines was taken over by the HSM, whereby the locomotives and rolling stock was also taken over. The HSM renumbered the ten locomotives in the series 1051–1060.

When the locomotives and rolling stock fleet of the HSM and the SS was merged in 1921, the locomotives of this series were given the NS numbers 7101–7110. No. 7110 was withdrawn from service in 1925, followed by No. 7107 in 1939. At the end of World War II, Nos. 7104, 7105 and 7108 were taken to Germany, of which only No. 7108 was returned to service. Of the locomotives that remained in the Netherlands, Nos. 7102 and 7109 were not repaired from war damage. The locomotives that did return to service after the war were withdrawn in 1949.

== Series SS 531-545 / NS 7111-7125 ==
A few years after the delivery of the first batch of ten tank locomotives, the SS ordered about fifteen similar locomotives from the same factory. The first seven were put into service in 1907 as SS 531–537. The SS 538-545 followed in 1908. The SS used these locomotives on light passenger trains on local railway lines. When the locomotives and rolling stock fleet of the HSM and the SS was merged in 1921, these locomotives were given the NS numbers 7111-7125 after the original ten HSM locomotives. No. 7114 was withdrawn from service in 1925, followed by No. 7116 in 1936.

During the German invasion, No. 7124 was run into the Potmarge near Leeuwarden to stop the advance of the enemy troops. After the locomotive was salvaged, it was not repaired. At the end of the war, Nos. 7117, 7118, 7120, 7122 and 7123 were taken to Germany. The first four returned damaged after the war, but were never repaired. No. 7123 did not return at all and was scrapped at Hagenow in 1951. Of the locomotives left behind in the Netherlands, Nos. 7113 and 7119 were not repaired from war damage. The remaining locomotives were withdrawn from service in 1947 and 1948.

Factorynumber	Date built	NFLS number	HSM number	SS number	NS number	Withdrawn	Notes
1376	1901	1	1051		7101	1949	
1377	1901	2	1052		7102	1947	Withdrawn and scrapped due to war damage.
1378	1901	3	1053		7103	1949	
1379	1901	4	1054		7104	1947	Taken to Germany, after the locomotive returned it was scrapped due to war damage.
1380	1901	5	1055		7105	1947	Taken to Germany, after the locomotive returned it was scrapped due to war damage.
1381	1901	6	1056		7106	1949	
1533	1902	7	1057		7107	1939	
1534	1902	8	1058		7108	1949	Taken to Germany, after the locomotive returned it was repaired.
1539	1902	9	1059		7109	1947	Withdrawn and scrapped due to war damage.
1540	1902	10	1060		7110	1925	
2139	1907			531	7111	1947	
2140	1907			532	7112	1947	
2141	1907			533	7113	1945	Withdrawn and scrapped due to war damage.
2142	1907			534	7114	1925	
2143	1907			535	7115	1948	
2144	1907			536	7116	1936	
2145	1907			537	7117	1947	Taken to Germany, after the locomotive returned it was scrapped due to war damage.
2120	1908			538	7118	1947	Taken to Germany, after the locomotive returned it was scrapped due to war damage.
2121	1908			539	7119	1945	Withdrawn and scrapped due to war damage.
2122	1908			540	7120	1947	Taken to Germany, after the locomotive returned it was scrapped due to war damage.
2123	1908			541	7121	1947	
2124	1908			542	7122	1947	Taken to Germany, after the locomotive returned it was scrapped due to war damage.
2125	1908			543	7123	1948	Taken to Germany. Scrapped in Hagenow in 1951.
2126	1908			544	7124	1940	On May 10, 1940, in Leeuwarden, run into the Potmarge to block the track for the advancing German troops.
2127	1908			545	7125	1948	

== Gallery ==
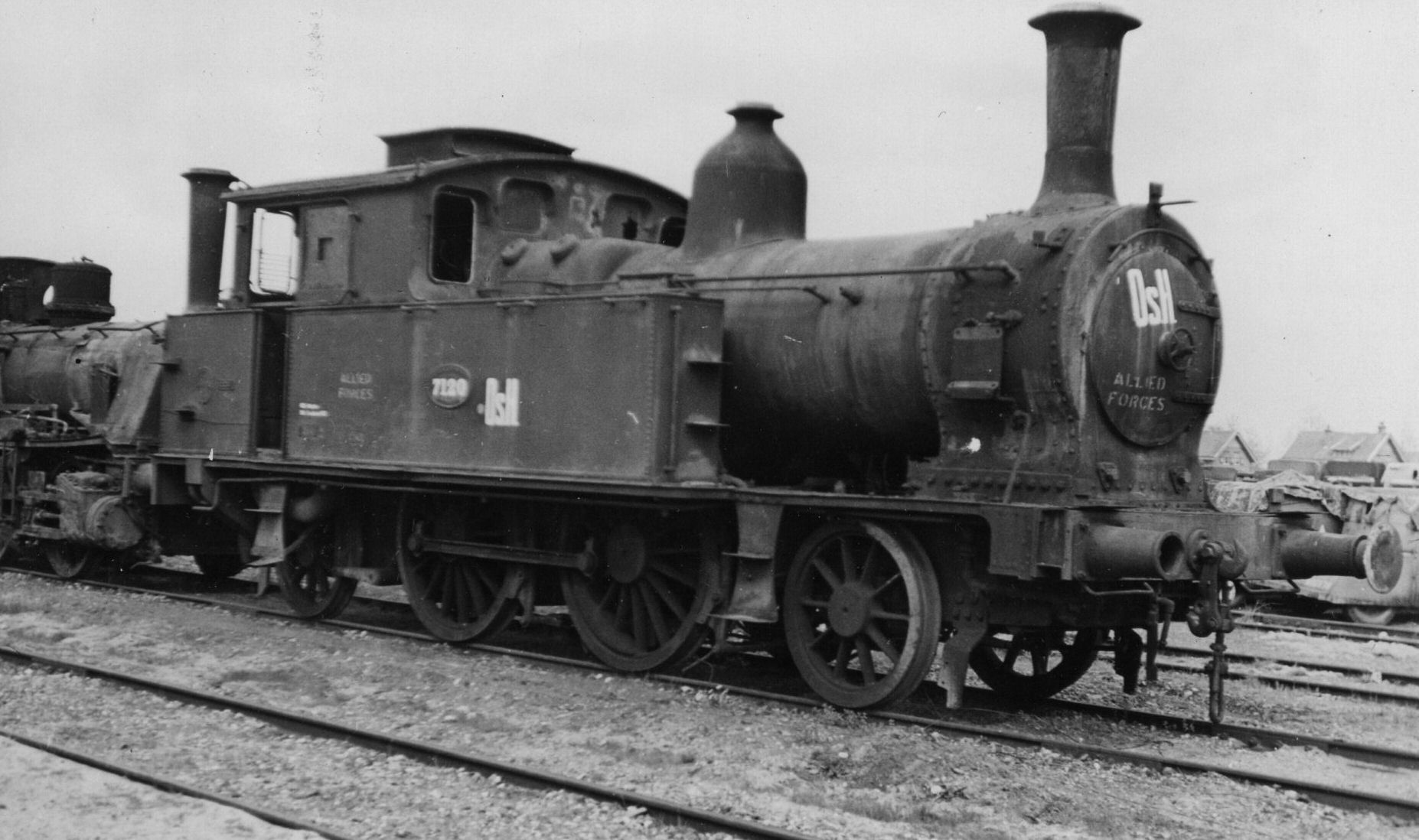
The war damaged and withdrawn NS 7120 at Baarle Nassau Grens

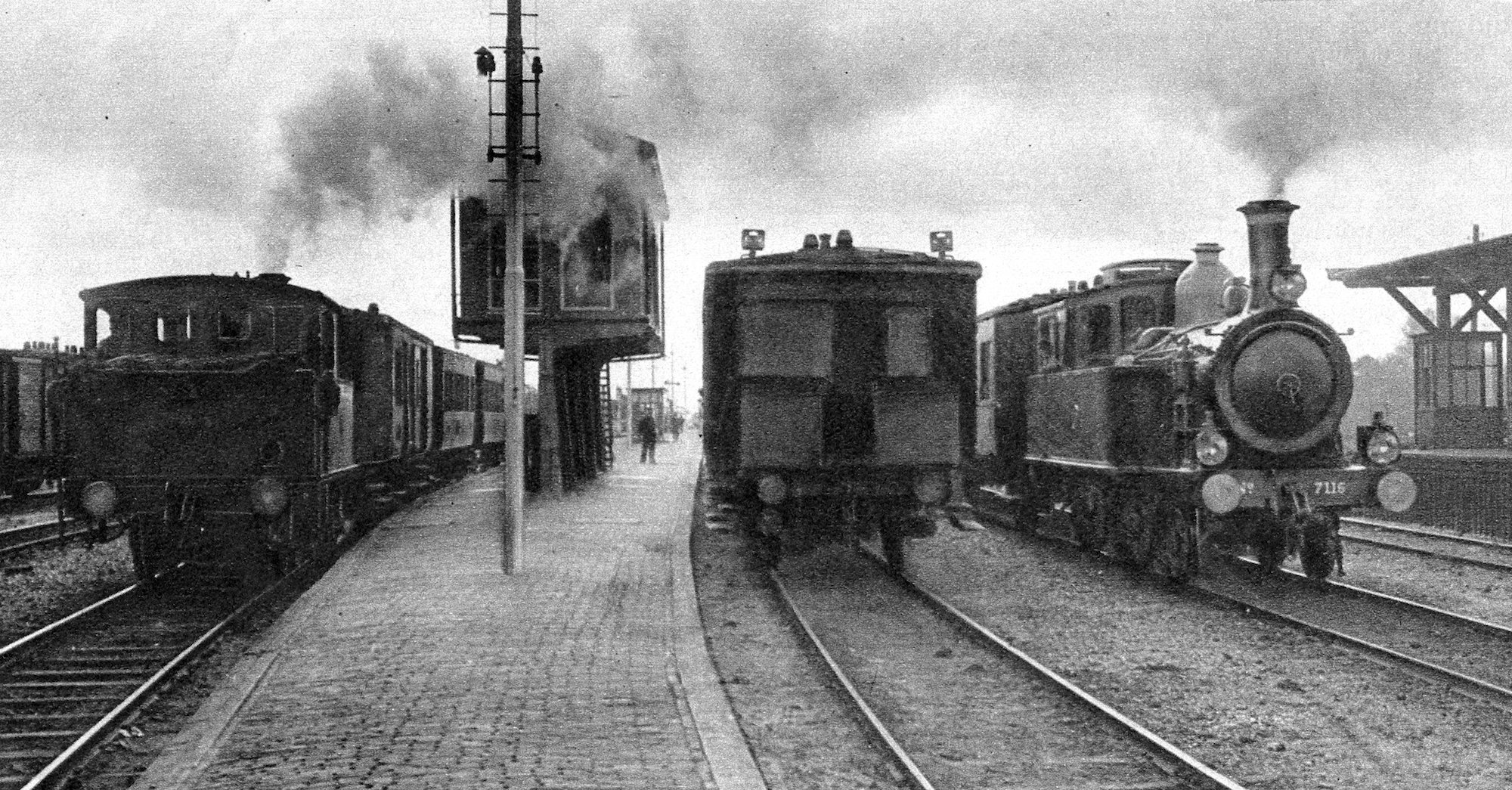
Some trains along the platform of Uithoorn station, with the NS 7116 on the right

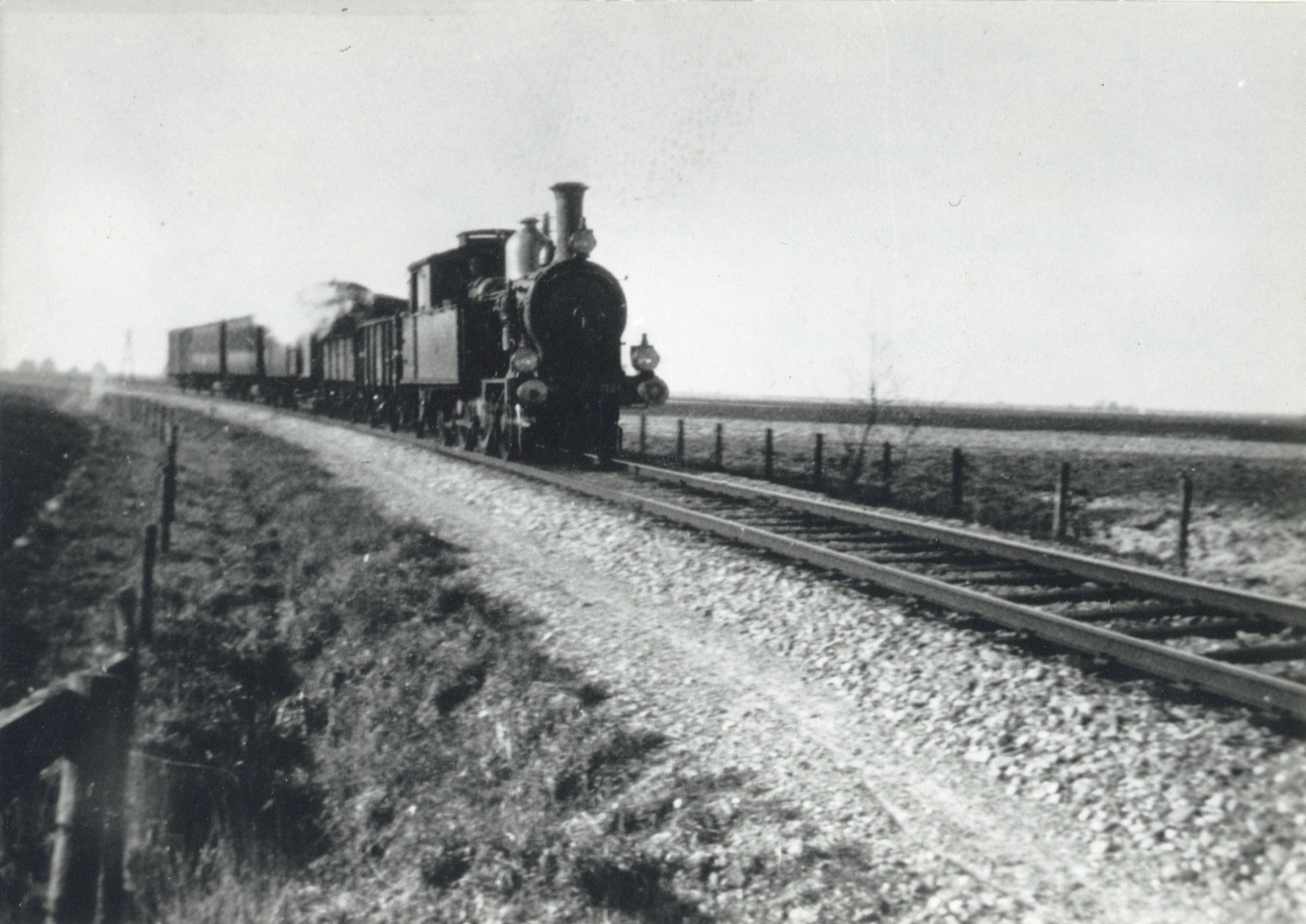
A locomotive of the series 7100 of the N.S. with a train between Hantum and Ternaard (April 1935)

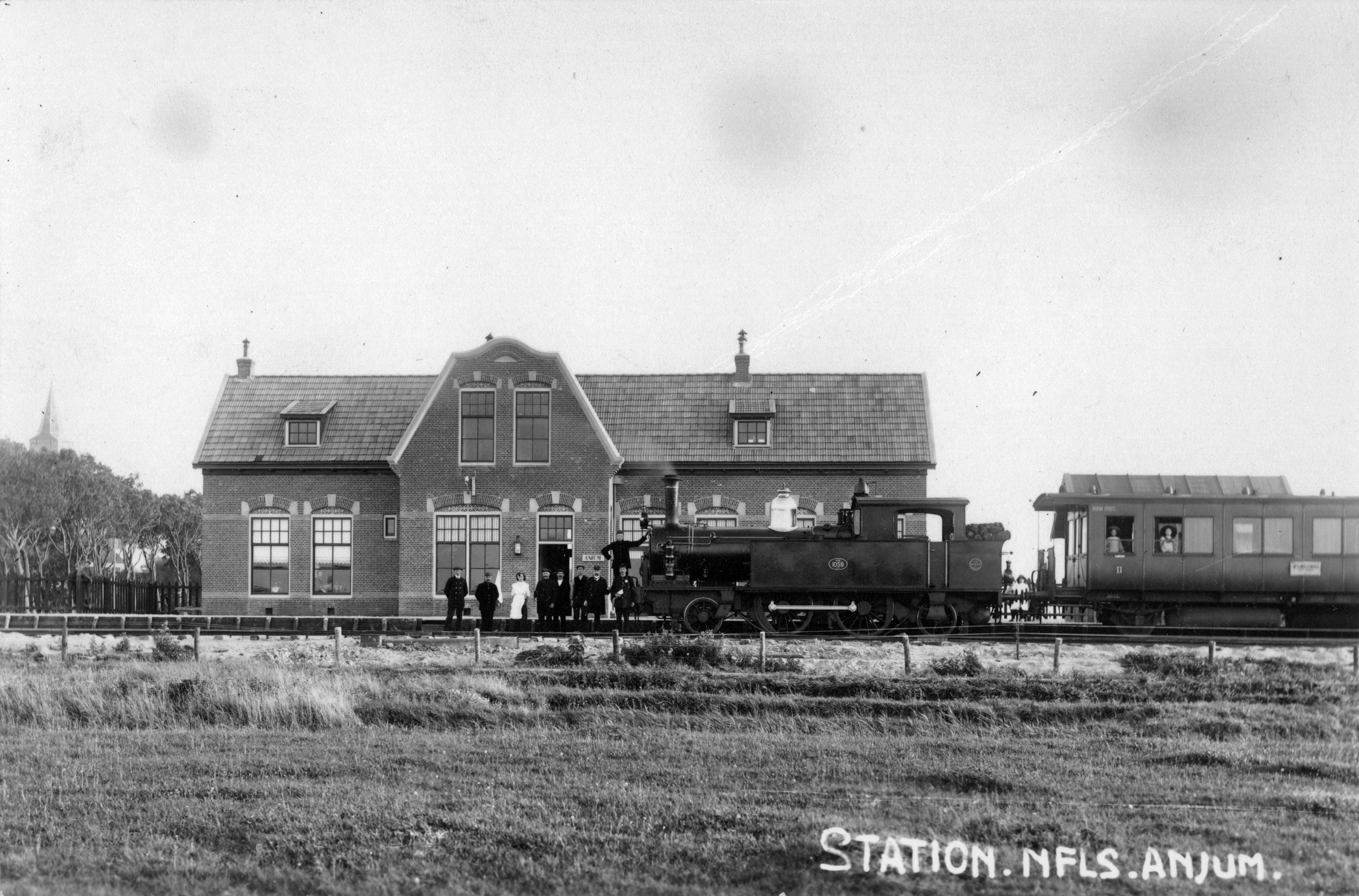
NS 7109 (NFLS No. 9) with a train along the platform of the Anjum station (Between 1913 and 1920)

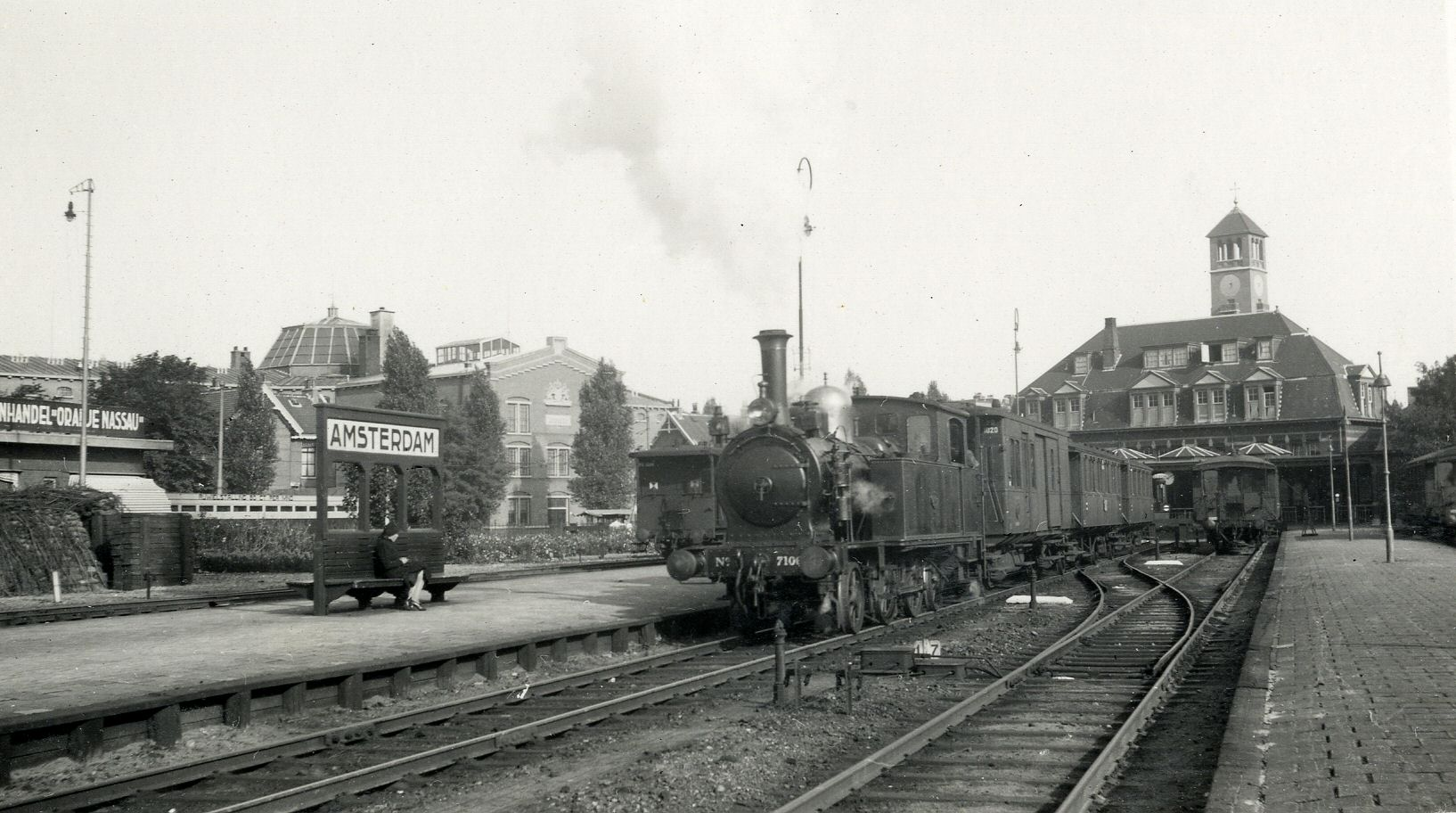
NS 7106 with a train along the platform of the Amsterdam Haarlemmermeer (Between 1925 and 1935)

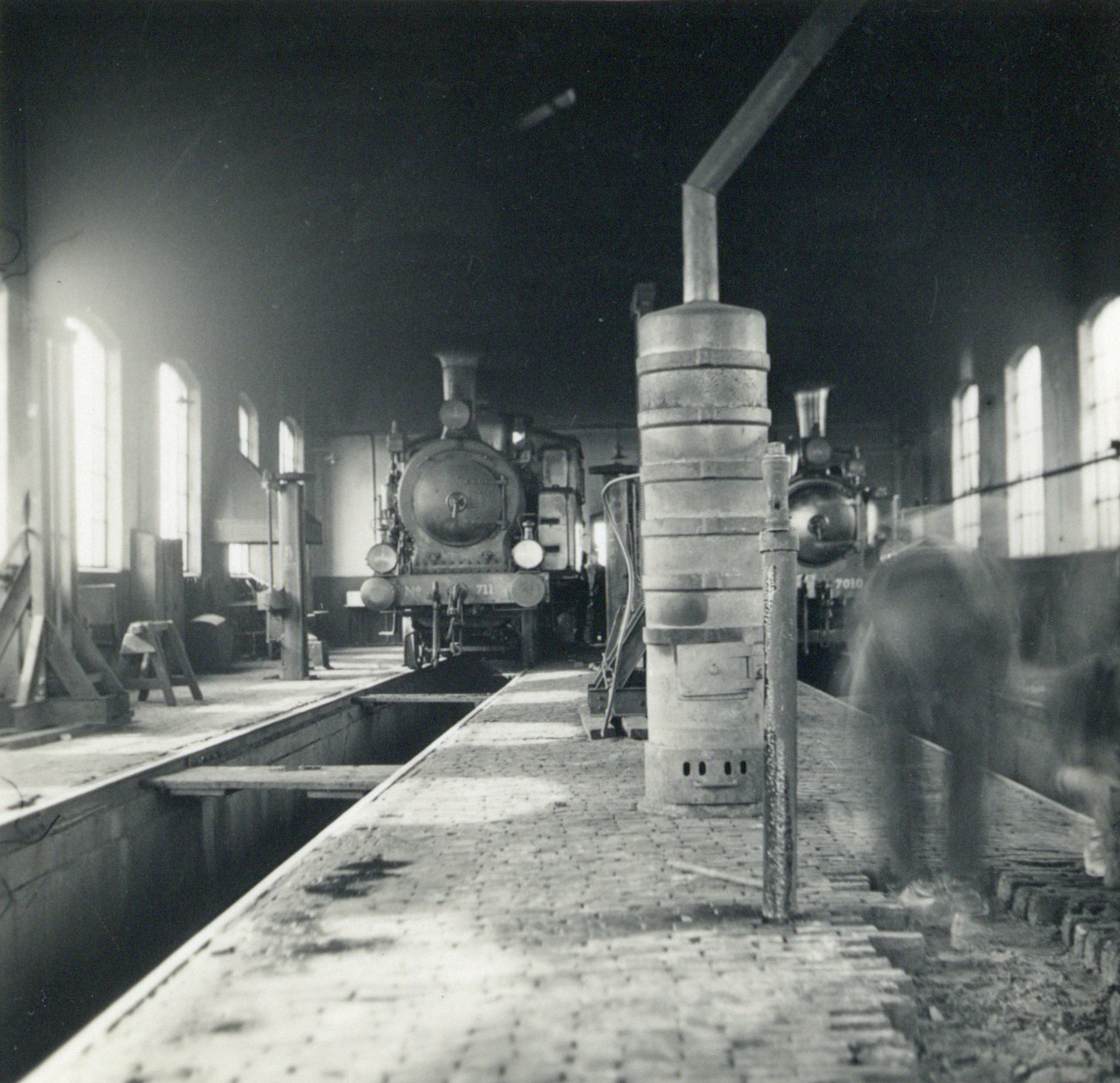
NS 7112 in Uithoorn (April 1940)

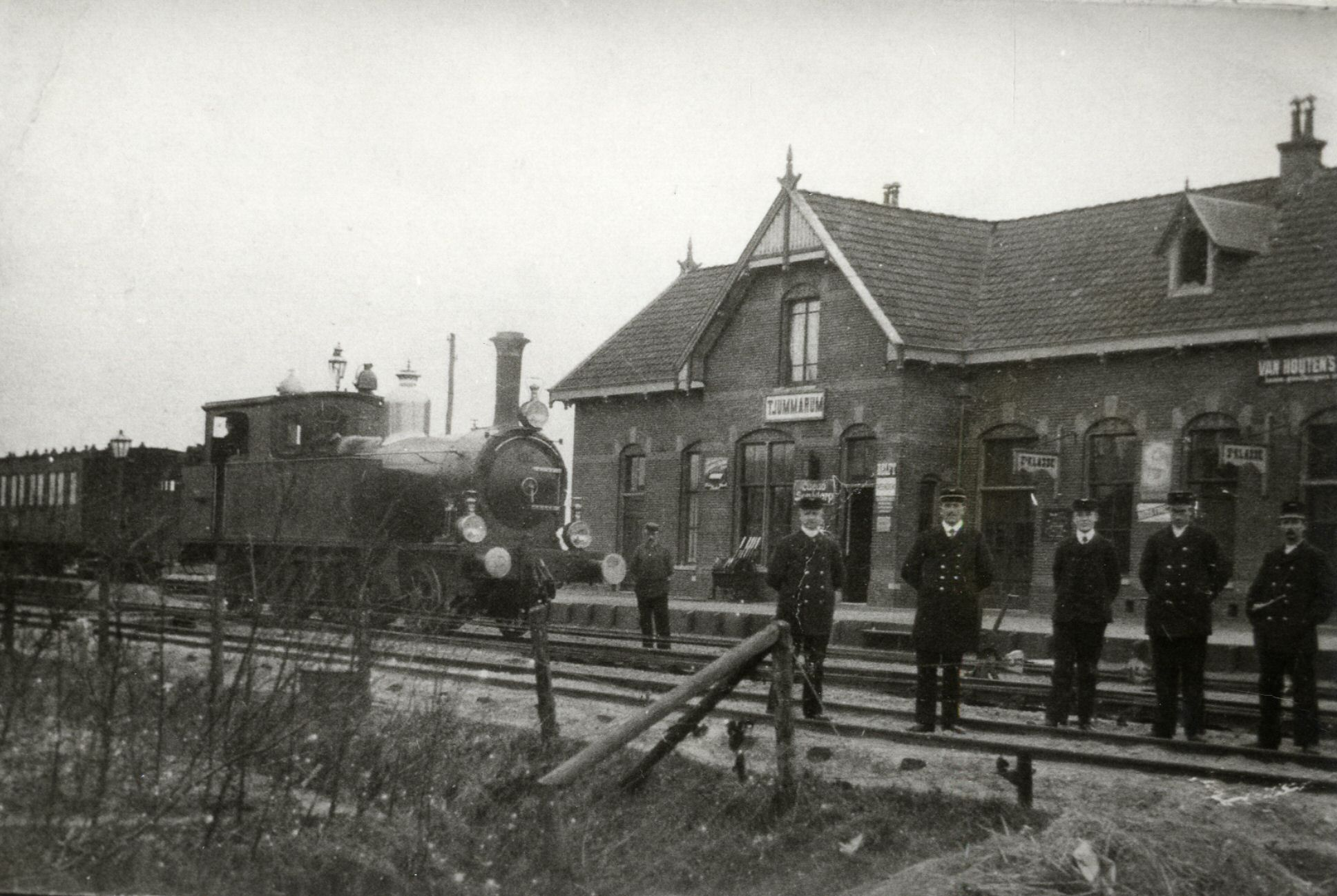
NS 7101 at Tjummarum station, with posing station staff (1917–1922)

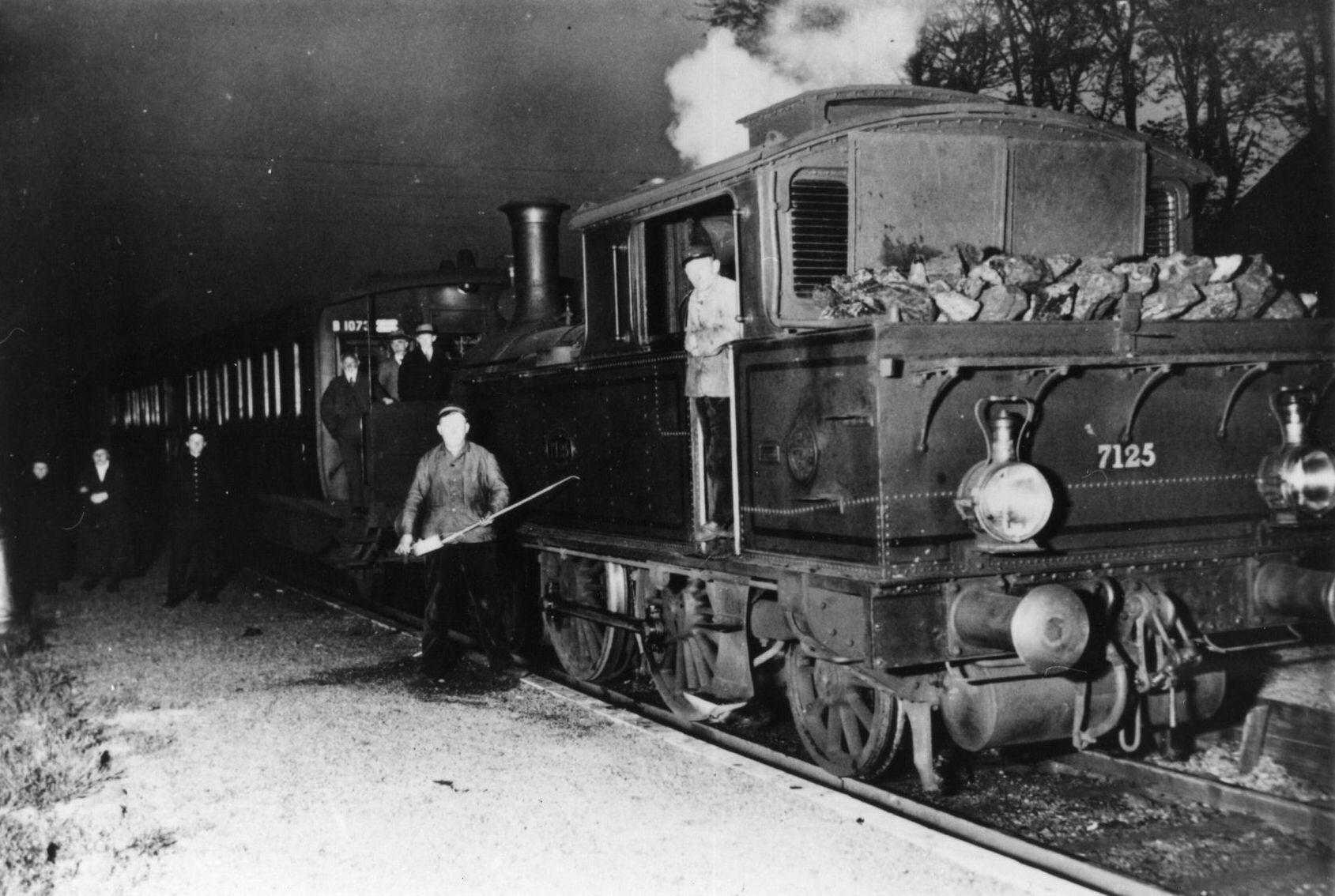
NS 7125 with the last passenger train on the route Tzummarum–Stiens (May 1936)

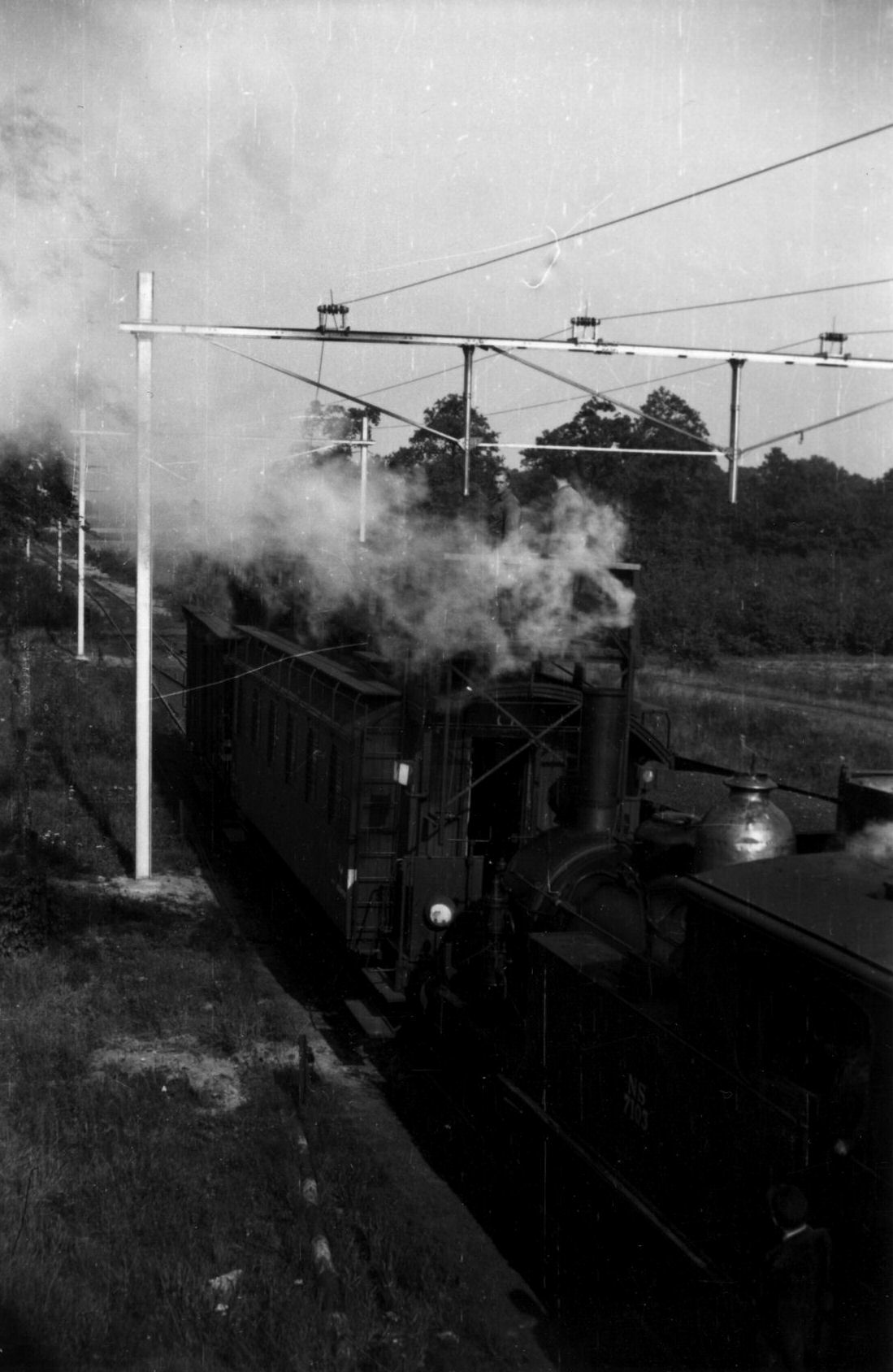
NS 7103 in Susteren during electrification work. (May 1936)

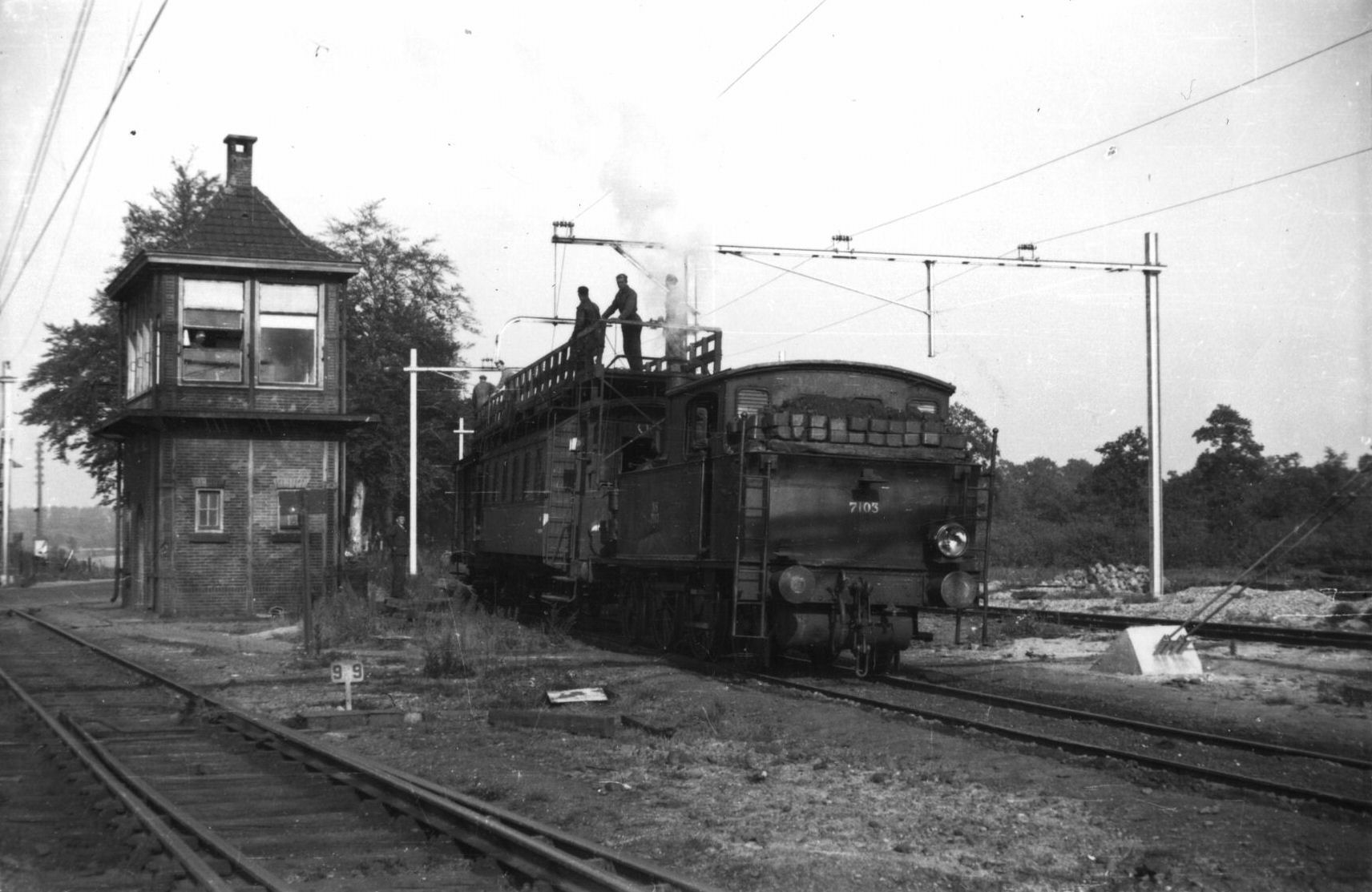
NS 7103 during the electrification of the shunting yard in Susteren (1948)

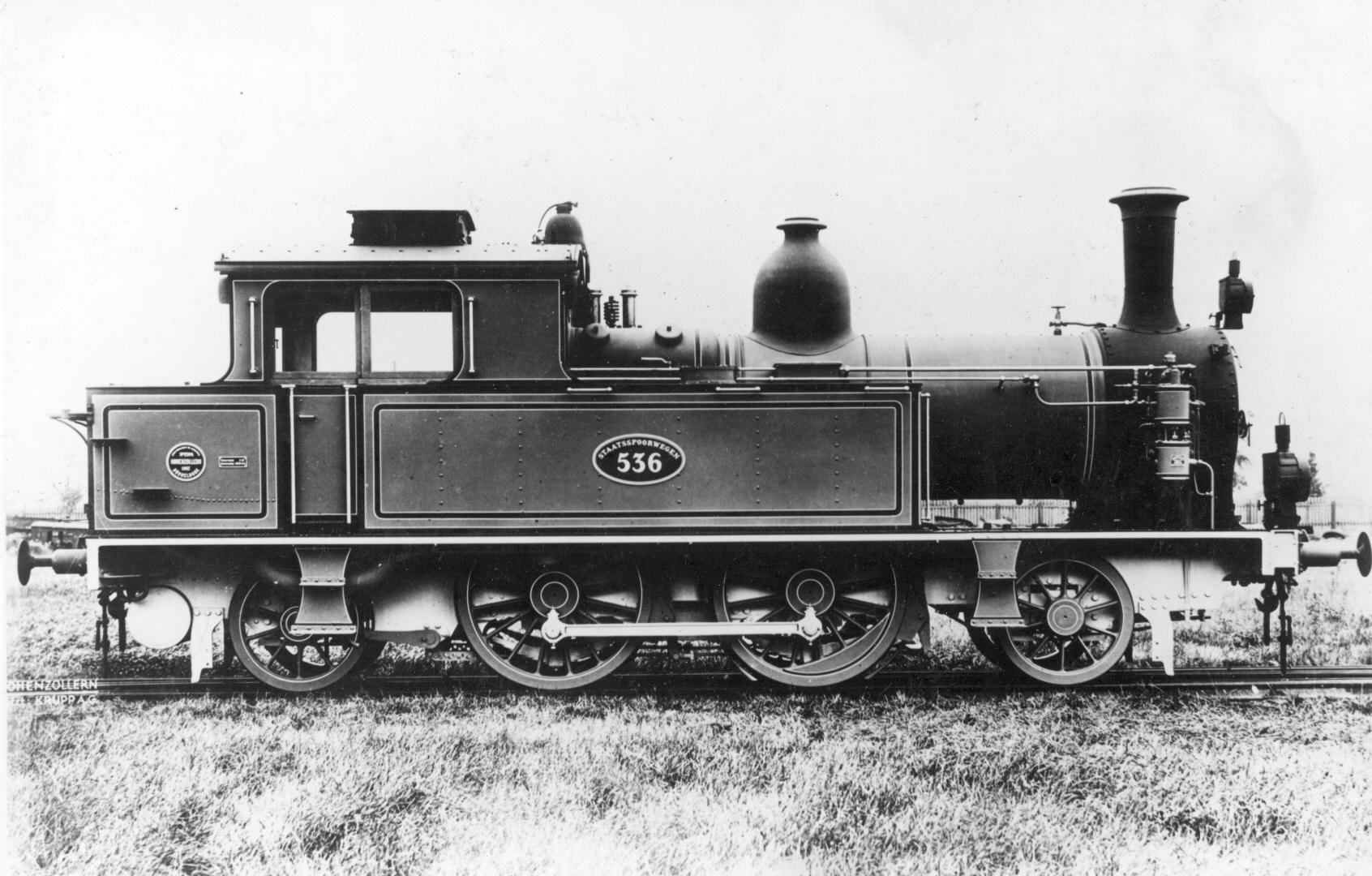
NS 7116, probably factory new (1907)

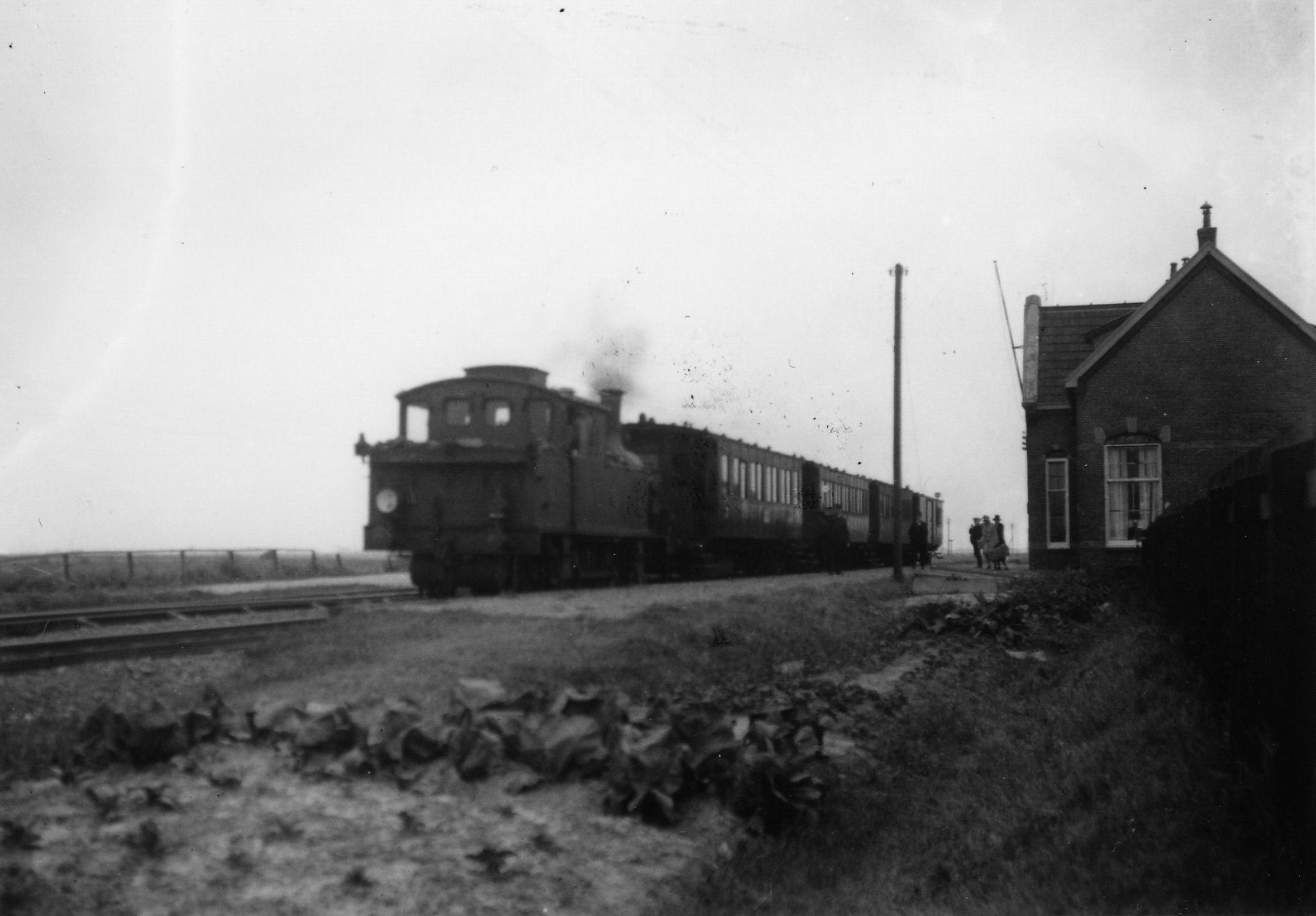
A locomotive of the series NS 7100 with a train at Metslawier station (1920–1940)

== Sources ==
- H. Waldorp: Onze Nederlandse stoomlocomotieven in woord en beeld. Uitg. De Alk, Alkmaar, 1981. ISBN 90-6013-909-7.
- J.J. Karskens: De Locomotieven van de Hollandsche IJzeren Spoorweg Maatschappij. Uitg. J.H. Gottmer, Haarlem - Antwerpen, 1947.
- R.C. Statius Muller, A.J. Veenendaal jr., H. Waldorp: De Nederlandse stoomlocomotieven. Uitg. De Alk, Alkmaar, 2005. ISBN 90-6013-262-9
- Jacq. van der Meer: De Hollandsche IJzeren Spoorweg-Maatschappij. Uitg. Uquilair, Rosmalen, 2009. ISBN 90-71513-68-8.
