= De Eendracht, Anjum =

Windmill in Anjum, Netherlands

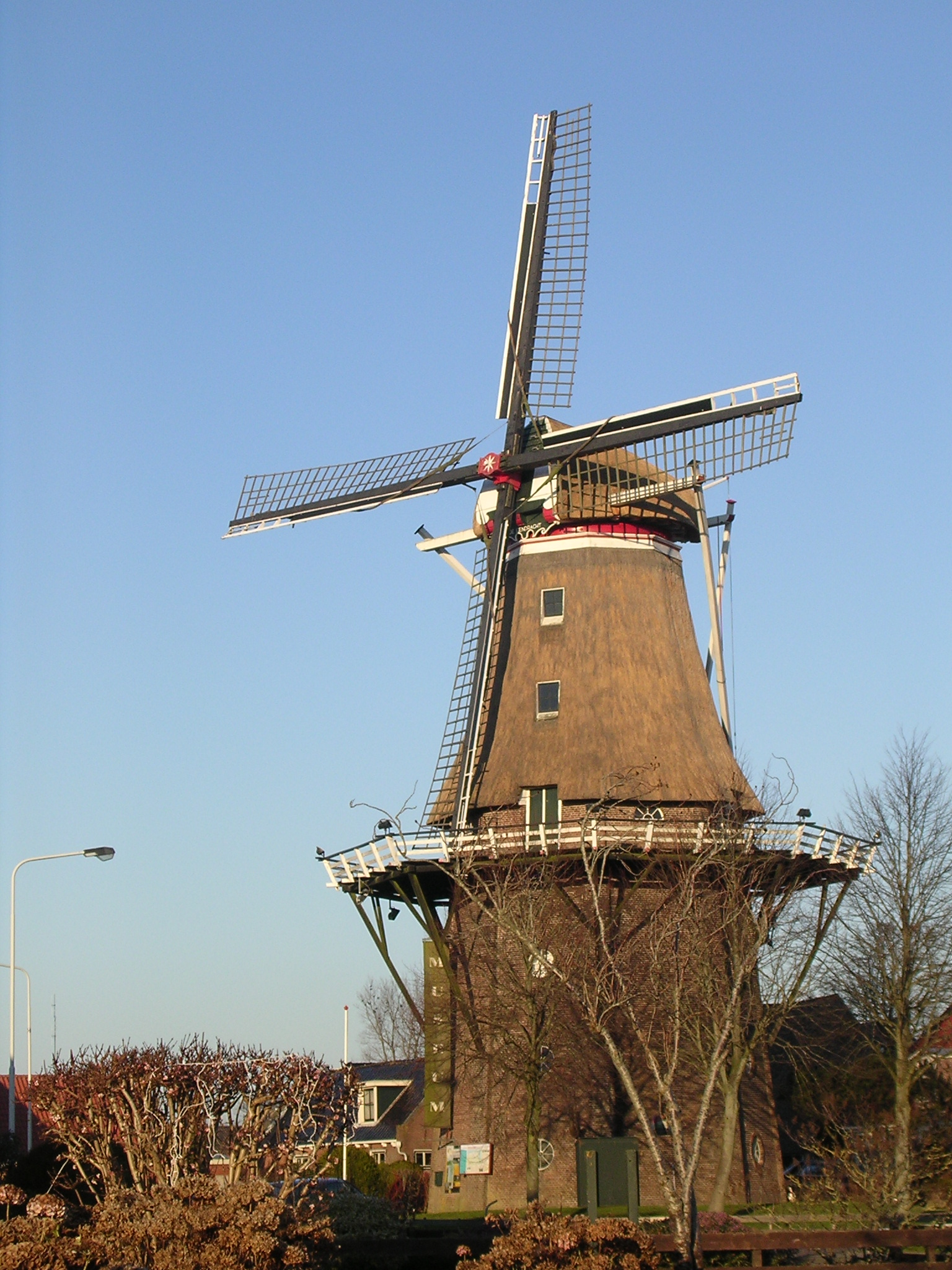
- De Eendracht, 2007

Origin
- Mill name: De Eendracht
- Mill location: Mouneborren 18, 9133 MB, Anjum
- Coordinates: 53°22′26″N 6°07′41″E
- Operator(s): Stichting Monumentenbehoud Dongeradeel
- Year built: 1889

Information
- Purpose: Corn and barley mill
- Type: Smock mill
- Storeys: Three-storey smock
- Base storeys: Five-storey base
- Smock sides: Eight sides
- No. of sails: Four sails
- Type of sails: Common sails
- Windshaft: Cast iron
- Winding: Tailpole and winch
- Auxiliary power: 40 horsepower (30 kW) hot bulb diesel engine
- No. of pairs of millstones: Four pairs
- Size of millstones: Two pairs 1.50 metres (4 ft 11 in) diameter French Burrs, two pairs 1.63 metres (5 ft 4 in) French Burrs

De Eendracht (Dutch pronunciation: [də ˈʔeːndrɑxt]; English: The Unity) is a smock mill in Anjum, Friesland, Netherlands which has been restored to working order. The mill is listed as a Rijksmonument, number 31556.

== History ==
The first mill on this site was a horse mill, De Gortmolen van Bakker Lambert (English: Baker Lambert's barley mill), which was in existence by 1500. Circa 1760, this was replaced by a smock mill. On 24 May 1889 this mill was struck by lightning and burnt down. The replacement mill, De Eendracht, was built by millwright G R van Wieren of Janum, for miller Doeke Turkstra. Parts from a demolished oil mill were incorporated into the new mill, as were parts from the saw mill De Haan (English: The Cockerel), which had also been demolished. Both these mills had stood in Leeuwarden.

Auxiliary power was provided by a 40 horsepower (30 kW) Kromhout Type ER III hot bulb diesel engine. The mill was working commercially until 1964 and was sold on 12 May 1967 to the Gemeente Oostdongeradeel for ƒ3,500. The mill was restored by millwright Christiaan Bremer of Adorp, Groningen in 1971-72.

The mill is used as a tourist information office by the VVV, as well as being kept in working order. Further restoration work was undertaken in 1995.

== Description ==
De Eendracht is what the Dutch describe as an "achtkante stellingmolen". It is a smock mill with a stage. The mill has a five-storey brick base. The stage is at 4th-floor level, 9.30 metres (30 ft 6 in) above ground level. The smock and cap are thatched. The cap is winded by a tail pole and winch. The four Common sails, which have a span of 22.10 metres (72 ft 6 in), are carried in a cast-iron windshaft. This was made by millwrights Prins van Oranje, The Hague in 1876. The windshaft also carries the brake wheel which has 63 cogs. This drives the wallower (34 cogs) at the top of the upright shaft. At the bottom of the upright shaft, the great spur wheel (100 cogs) drives the lantern pinion stone nuts for the millstones (25 and 27 staves) and the lantern pinion stone nuts for the pearl barley stones (21 staves). All four pairs of stones are French Burrs, those used for flour milling are 1.50 metres (4 ft 11 in) diameter. The pearl barley stones are 1.63 metres (5 ft 4 in) diameter.

== Public access ==
De Eendracht is open Tuesday to Saturday from 10:00 - 17:00, April - October, and Saturdays only from 10:00 to 17:00 November to March.
