= Noord-Friesche Locaalspoorweg-Maatschappij =

Railway in Friesland, Netherlands

Noord-Friesche Locaalspoorweg-Maatschappij ('North Friesland Railway Company') operated a light railway serving the sparsely populated province of Friesland in northern Netherlands. The line spanned approximately 91 kilometers (57 miles) and was built to 1,435 mm (4 ft 8 1/2 in) standard gauge.

== History ==
The NFLS had a network of lines in North Friesland. The lines opened in eight stages:

Leeuwarden – Ferwerd	22 April 1901
Ferwerd – Metslawier	2 October 1901
Stiens – Tzummarum	2 December 1902
Tzummarum – Franeker Halte	1 October 1903
Tzummarum – Midlum-Herbaijum	1 October 1903
Midlum-Herbaijum – Harlingen	2 May 1904
St. Jacobiparochie – Berlikum (freight only)	before 1910
Metslawier – Anjum	24 August 1913

Wetsens station closed in May 1902, less than eight months after opening. On 1 December 1905, the NFLS was taken over by the Hollandsche IJzeren Spoorweg-Maatschappij (HSM), which itself was nationalized on 1 December 1938, becoming part of Nederlandse Spoorwegen (NS).

== Locomotives ==
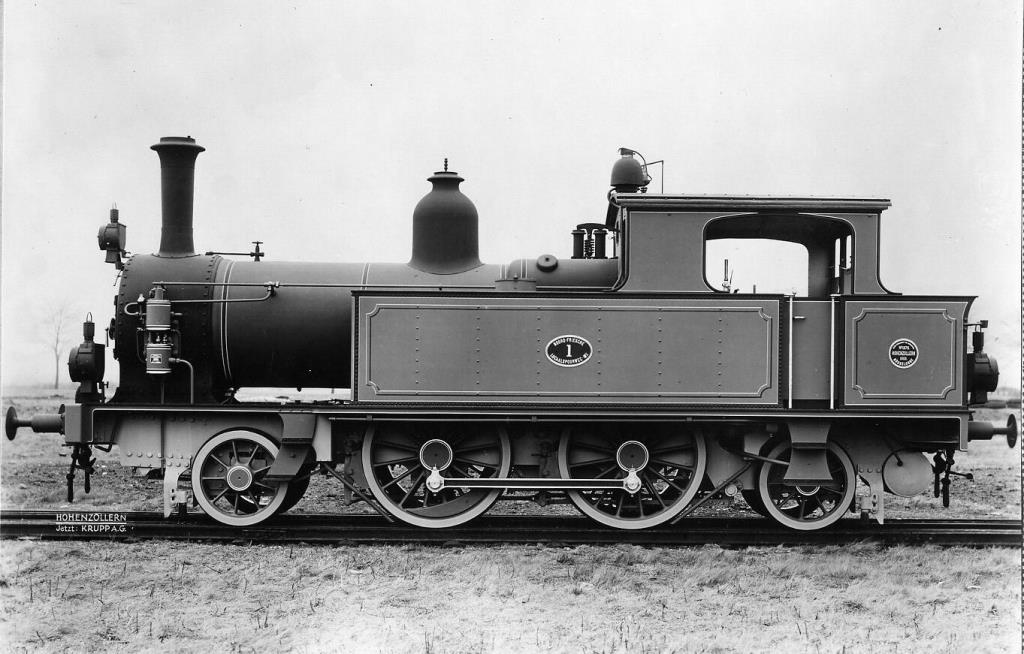
N.F.L.M No.1

The NFLS had a fleet of ten 2-4-2T locomotives, numbered 1-10. They became HSM 1051-60 and later the NS 7101-10. The locomotives cost ƒ23,300 each and were built by Hohenzollern.

== Carriages ==
The NFLS had the following passenger stock, all built by Nederlandsche Fabriek van Werktuigen & Spoorwegmaterieel, Amsterdam:

Qty	Type	Class	NFLS Nº	HSM Nº	NS Nº
10	four-wheel carriage	2nd class	B1–10	B1060–69	B1071–80
25	four-wheel carriage	3rd class	C1–25	C1072–96	C1146–70
2	four-wheel brake carriage	2nd class	BDL1–2	BDP1070–71	1001–02
3	four-wheel brake carriage	post and baggage	LD1–3	DP3003–05	PD1026–28

== Goods wagons ==
The NFLS had the following goods wagons:

Qty	Type	NFLS Nº	HSM Nº	NS Nº
2	van	DE1–2	DP3001–02	D2261–62
9	van with guard cab	CHG1–9	11950–58	CHC3236–44
2	van with steam heating	CHFF51–52	11959–60	CHC3561–62
4	open wagon with guard cab	CL201–04	29960–73	GL43661–64
16	open wagon	CL301–16	29974–89	GL41816–31
2	van with guard shelter	FO601–02	5490–91	FB70774–75
8	van	FO651–58	5492–99	FB70571–78
3	water tank 1 × 5,200 litres 1,100 imperial gallons; 1,400 US gallons 2 × 6,500 litres 1,400 imperial gallons; 1,700 US gallons	WW1–3	4197–99 to 1911; 4142–44 after 1911	158059; 158056–57
1	ballast wagon	1	13646	—

The rolling stock was all built by Nederlandsche Fabriek van Werktuigen & Spoorwegmaterieel, Amsterdam, except for the two 6,500-liter water tankers, which were built by Nivelles in 1896 and acquired secondhand.

== Closures ==
The lines were closed gradually, with some short-term reopenings occurring during the Second World War:

Section	Date	Action
Tzummarum – Franeker Halte	8 October 1933	closed, track lifted
Tzummarum – Harlingen	15 May 1935	closed to passengers
Dokkum-Aalsum – Anjum	15 May 1935	closed to passengers
Stiens – Tzummarum	15 May 1936	closed to passengers
Leeuwarden – Dokkum-Aalsum	1 July 1936	closed to passengers
Midlum-Herbaijum – Harlingen	11 January 1938	closed, track lifted
Leeuwarden – Dokkum-Aalsum	28 May 1940	reopened to passengers
Stiens – Tzummarum	28 May 1940	reopened to passengers
Leeuwarden – Dokkum-Aalsum	1 December 1940	closed to passenger
Dokkum-Aalsum – Anjum	27 July 1942	closed
Stiens – Tzummarum	30 October 1942	closed to passengers
Tzummarum – Midlum-Herbaijum	7 December 1961	closed, track lifted
Minnertsga – Tzummarum	4 May 1966	closed, track lifted
Mooie Paal – Berlikum	27 September 1971	closed, track lifted
Stiens – Minnertsga	1973	closed
Holwerd – Dokkum Aalsum	1975	closed
Stiens – Holwerd	1978	closed
Stiens – Dokkum-Aalsum	1980	track lifted
Stiens – Minnertsga	1980	track lifted
Leeuwarden – Stiens	1997	closed
Leeuwarden station	2006	track lifted

== Stations ==
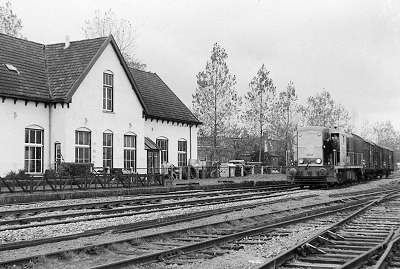
Stiens

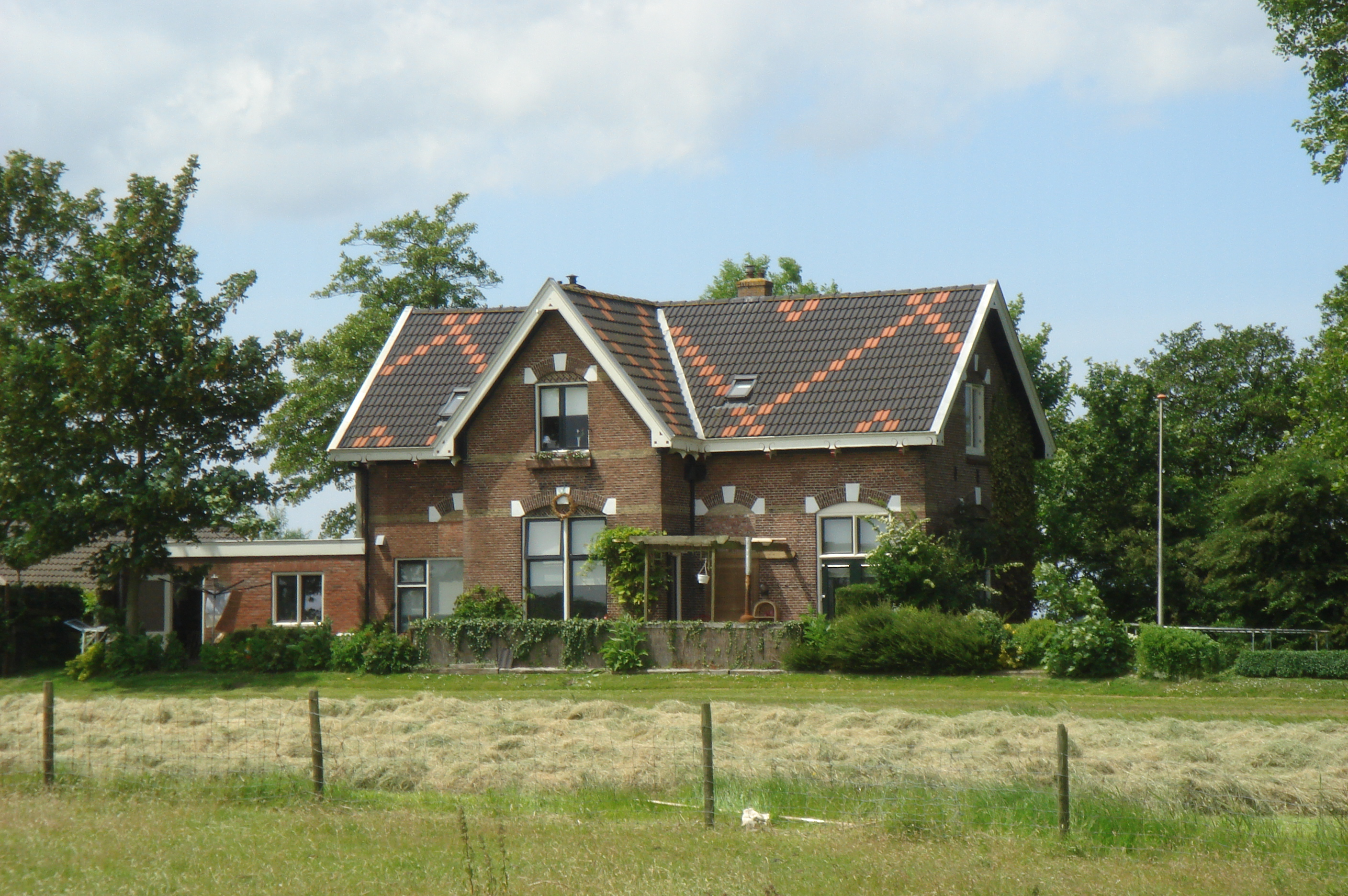
Hijum

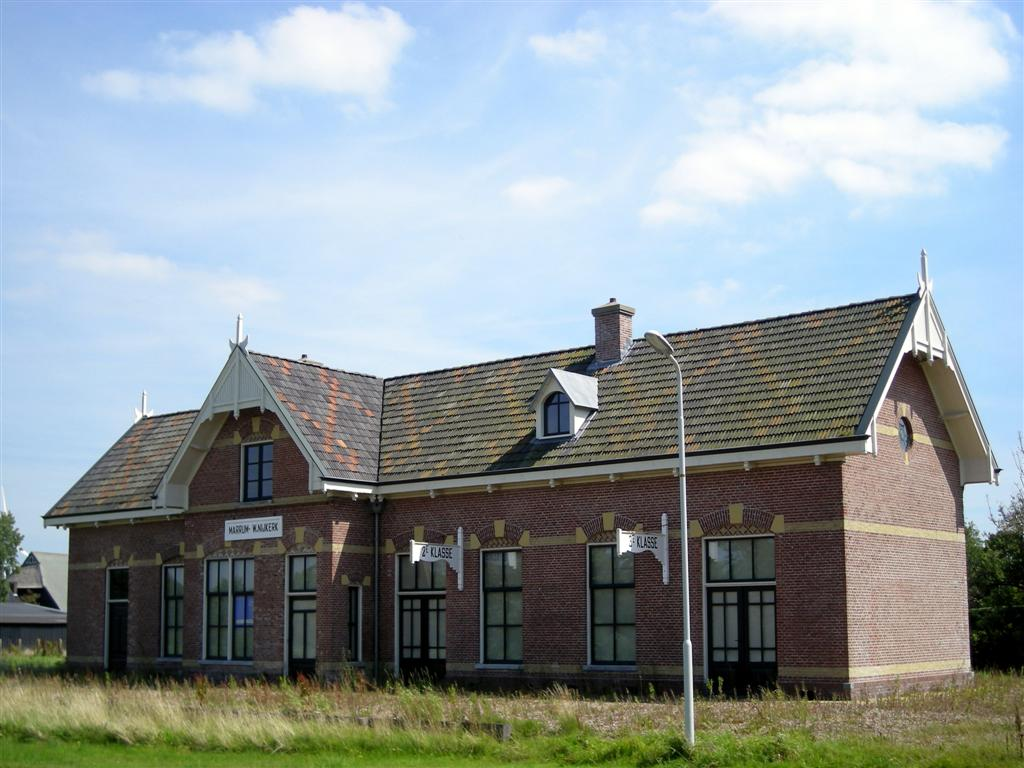
Marrum-Westernijkerk

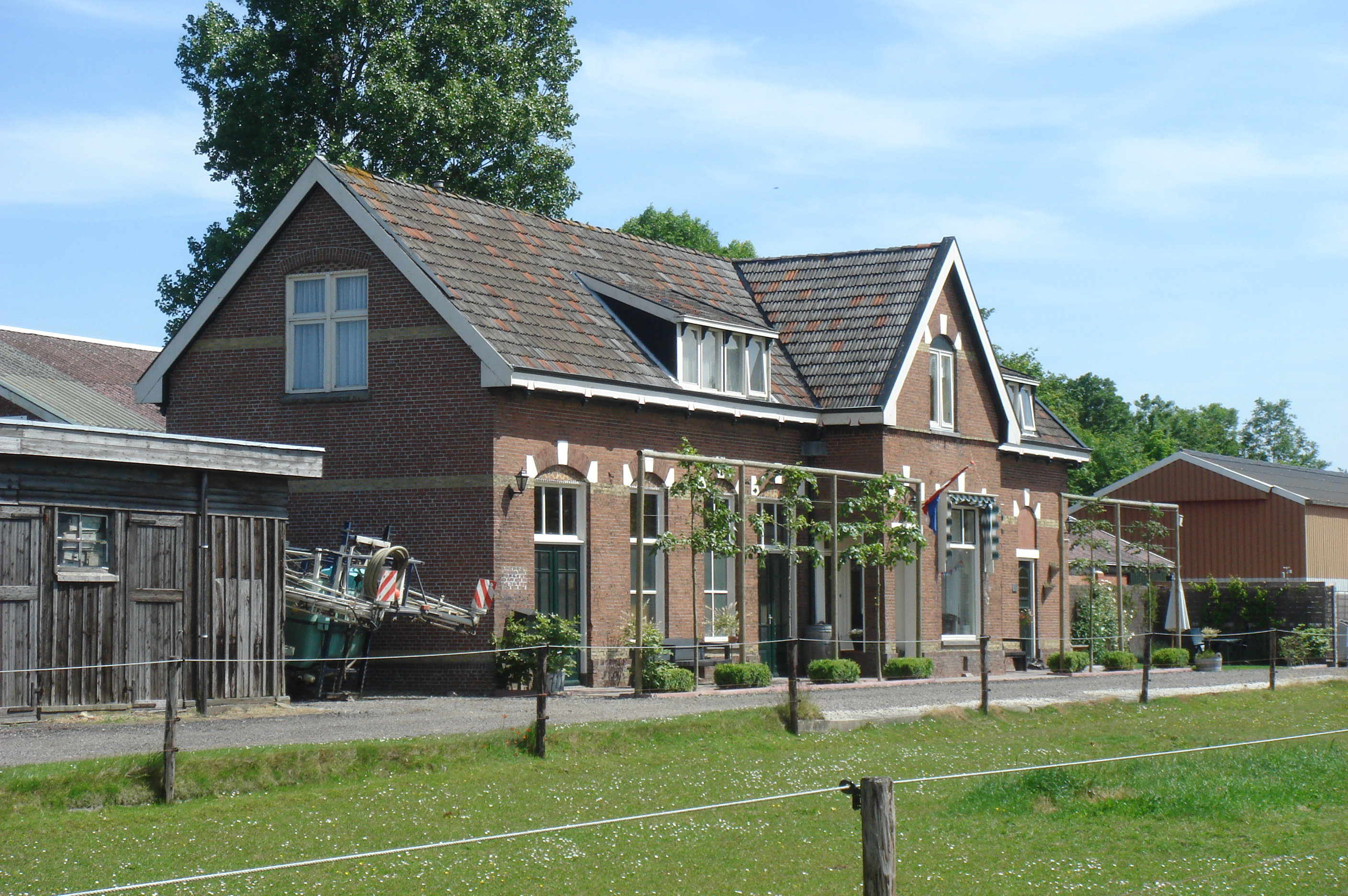
Ternaard

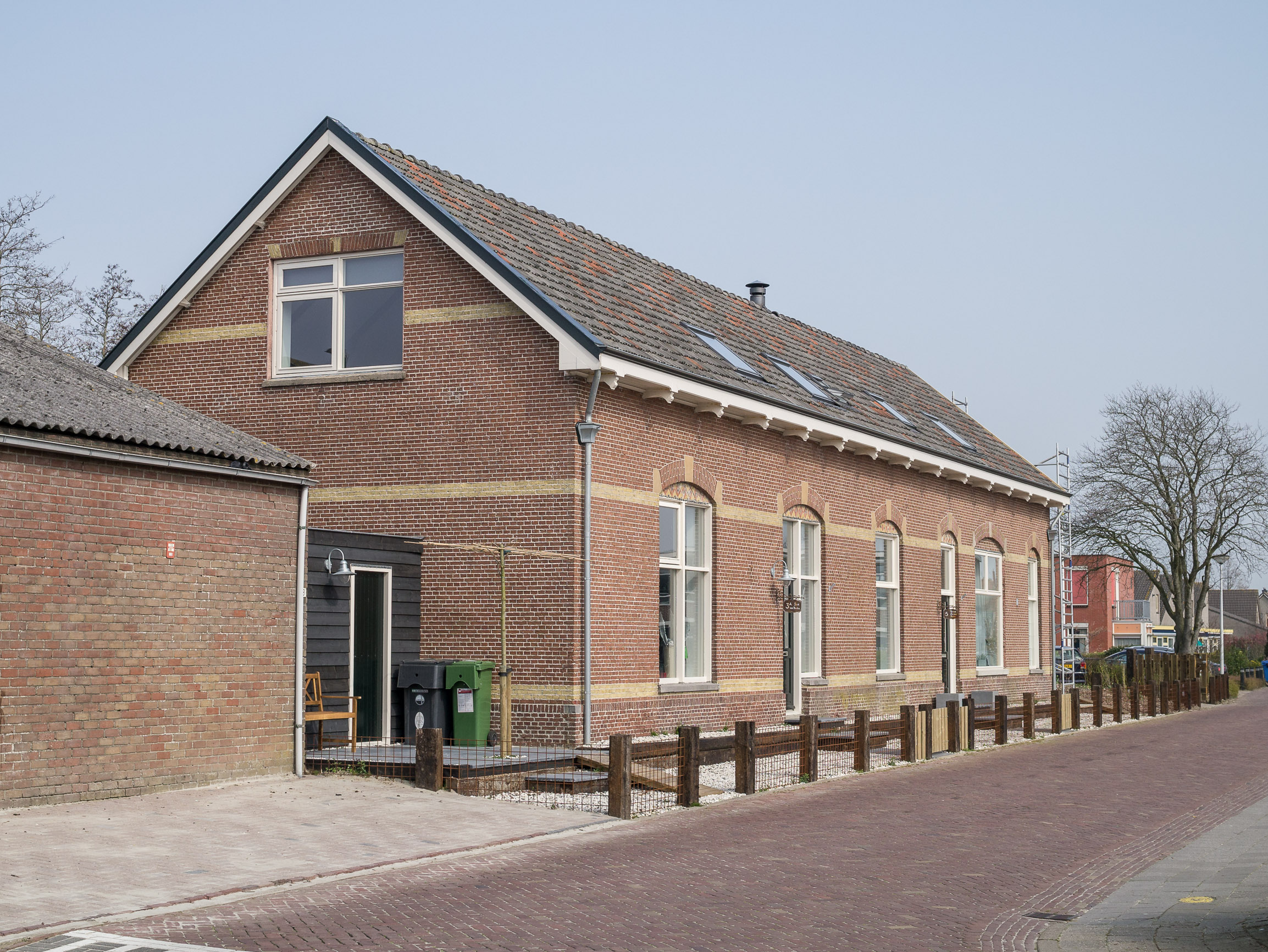
Sint Annaparochie

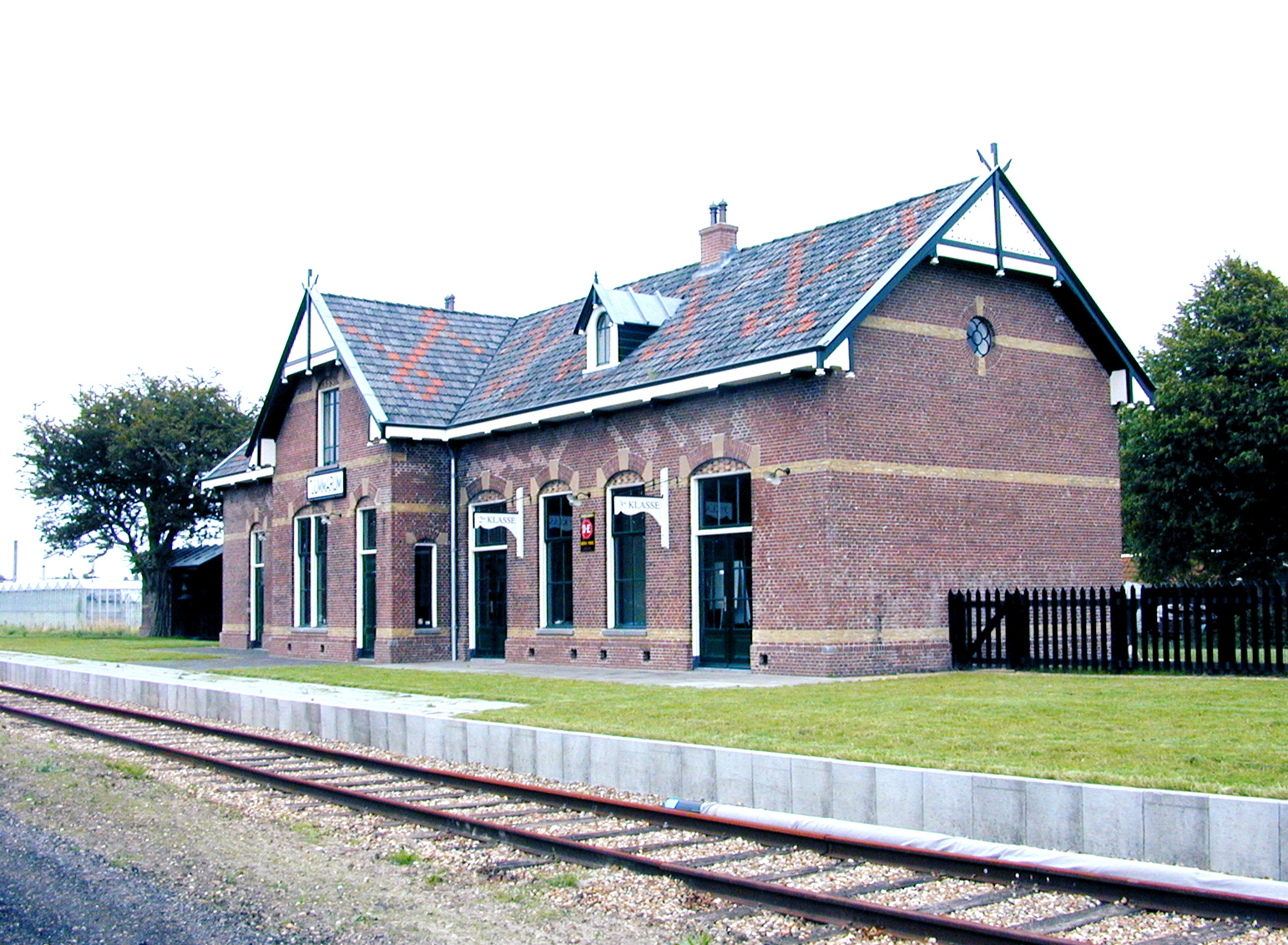
Tzummarum

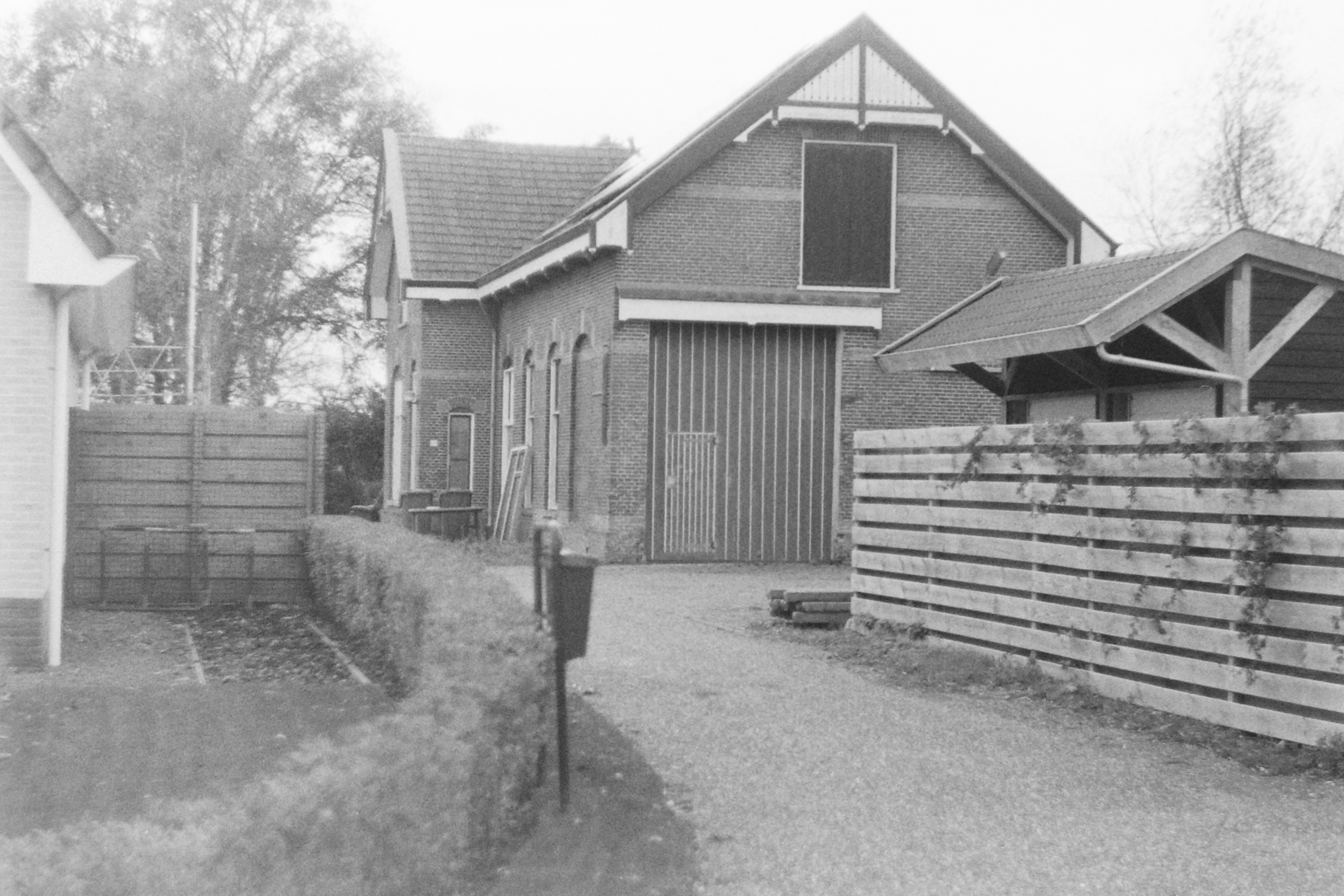
Sexbierum-Pieterbierum

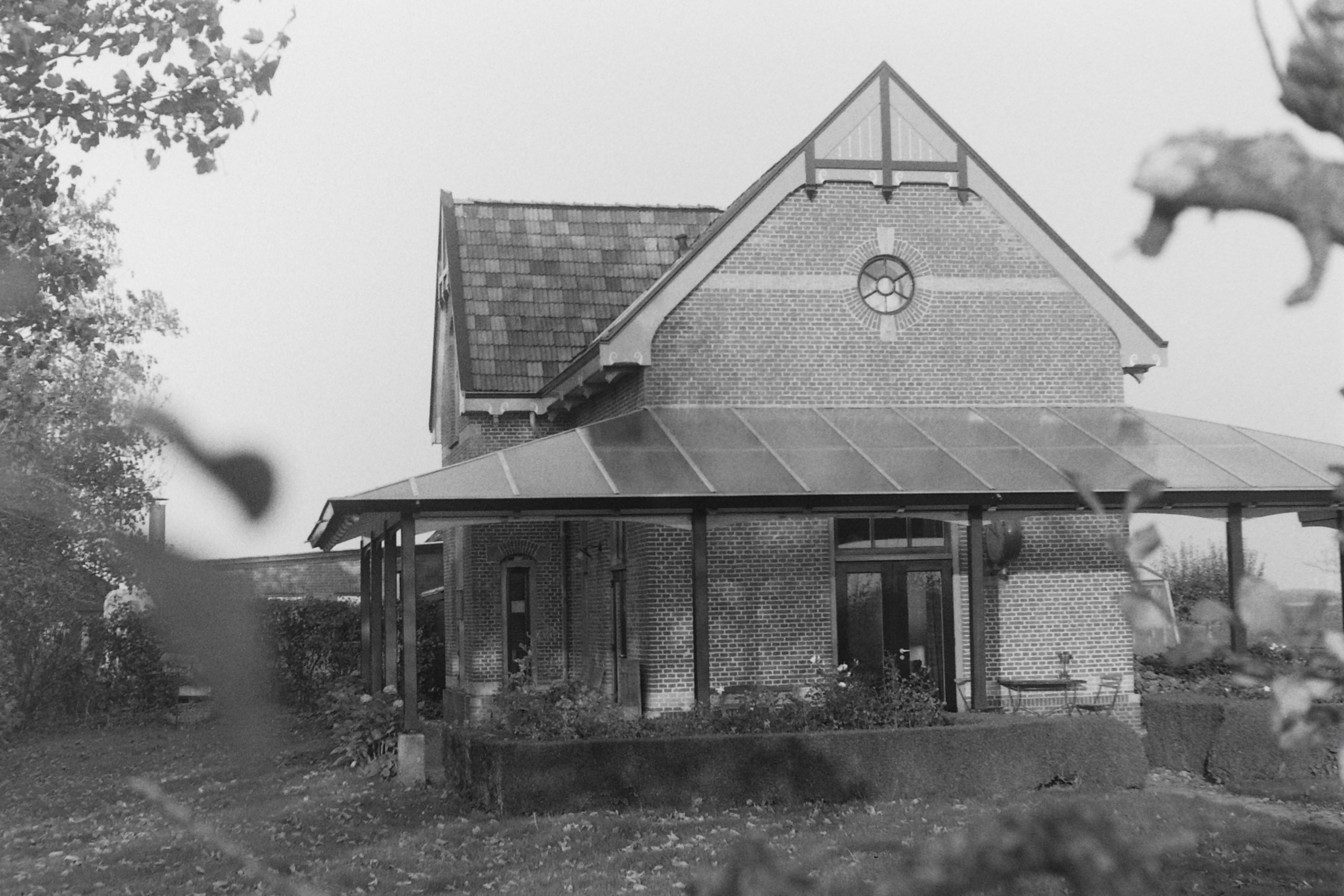
Wijnaldum

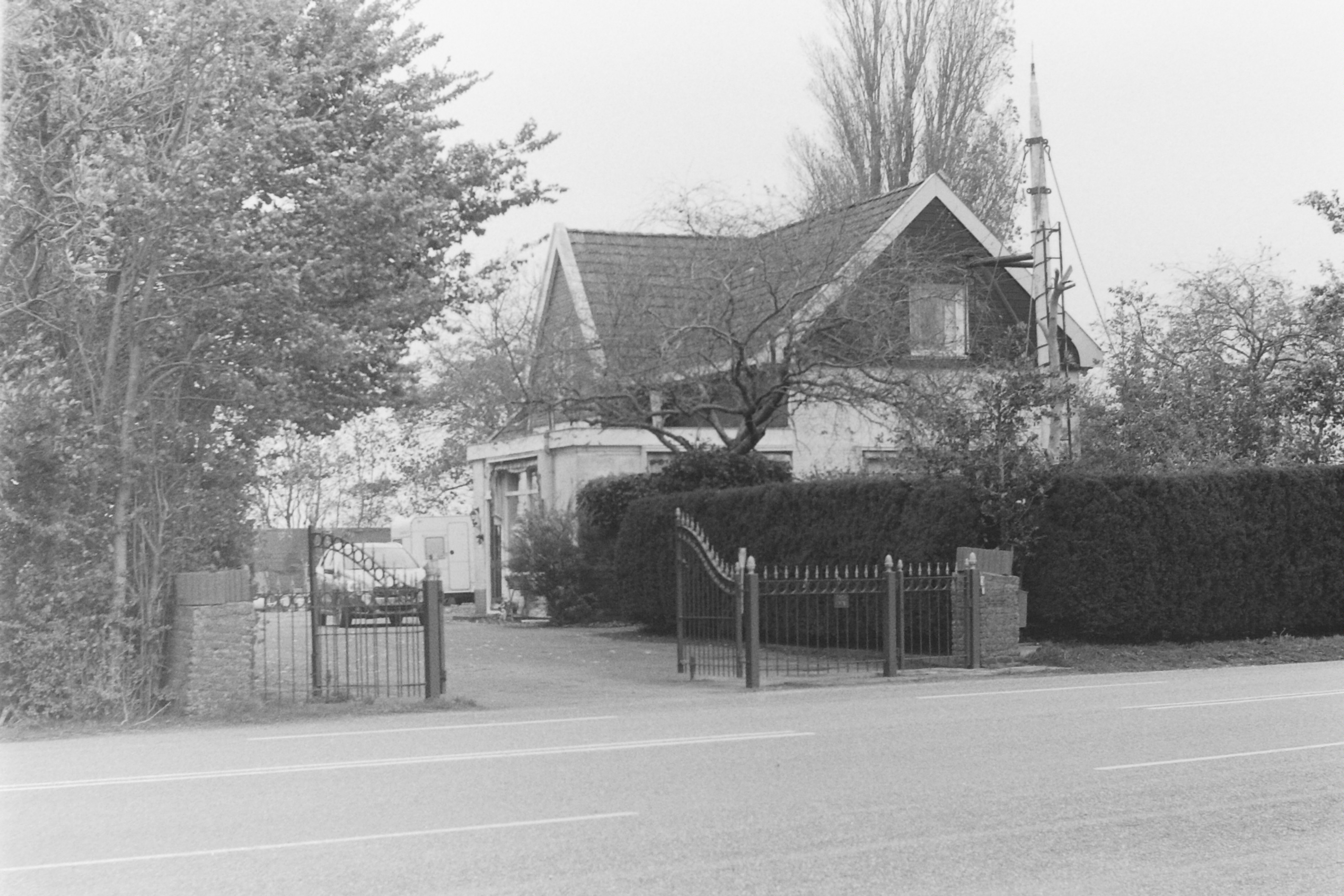
Midlum-Herbaijum

=== Leeuwarden - Anjum line ===
Distances are measured from Leeuwarden station.

- Leeuwarden 0 km (0 mi)
- Leeuwarden Rijksweg 3 km (1.9 mi) (Leeuwarden Rijksweg (or Halte) station was demolished in 1970)
- Jelsum 5 km (3.1 mi) (Jelsum station was demolished in 1944)
- Cornjum 7 km (4.3 mi)
- Britsum 8 km (5.0 mi)
- Stiens 9 km (5.6 mi)
- Finkum 11 km (6.8 mi) (Finkum station was demolished by 1970)
- Hijum 13 km (8.1 mi)
- Hallum 15 km (9.3 mi) (Hallum station was demolished in 1970)
- Marrum-Westenijkerk 18 km (11 mi)
- Ferwerd 20 km (12 mi) (Ferwerd station was demolished in 1974)
- Blija 22 km (14 mi)
- Holwerd 26 km (16 mi)
- Ternaard 30 km (19 mi)
- Hantum 32 km (20 mi) (Hantum station was demolished by 1960)
- Dokkum-Aalsum 37 km (23 mi) (Dokkum-Aalsum station was demolished in 1974)
- Wetsens 40 km (25 mi) (Wetsens station closed in May 1902)
- Metslawier 42 km (26 mi)
- Morra-Lioessens 45 km (28 mi)
- Anjum 47 km (29 mi)

=== Stiens - Harlingen line ===
- Vrouwbuurtstermolen 13 km
- Vrouwenparochie 14 km (Vrouwenparochie station was demolished in 2002)
- Langhuisterweg 16 km
- St. Annaparochie 17 km
- Koudeweg 19 km
- St. Jacobiparochie 21 km (St. Jabobiparochie station was demolished by 1960)
- Minnertsga 24 km
- Firdgum 26 km
- Tzummarum 27 km
- Oosterbierum 30 km (Oosterbierum station was demolished by 1980)
- Sexbierum-Pieterbierum 32 km
- Wijnaldum 35 km
- Midlum-Herbaijum 36 km
- Koetille 38 km
- Harlingen 39 km

=== St. Jacobiparochie - Berlikum line ===
- Berlikum

=== Tzummarum - Franeker line ===
- Dongjum 31 km
- Franeker Halte 34 km

== Accidents ==
On 12 June 1927, NS locomotive 7124 derailed near Holwerd and ended up on its side in a canal. The locomotive was recovered on 23 June and returned to service after repairs were made.

== See also ==
- Spoorlijn Leeuwarden - Anjum (Dokkumer Lokaaltje) (in Dutch)
- Noord-Friesche Locaalspoorweg-Maatschappij (in Dutch)
- Spoorlijn Stiens - Harlingen (in Dutch)
- Spoorlijn Tzummarum - Franeker (in Dutch)

Information contained in the above articles has been used in compiling this article.

- Spoar fan Ljouwert nei Eanjum (in West Frisian)
