= Westhoek, Friesland =

Westhoek
- Village
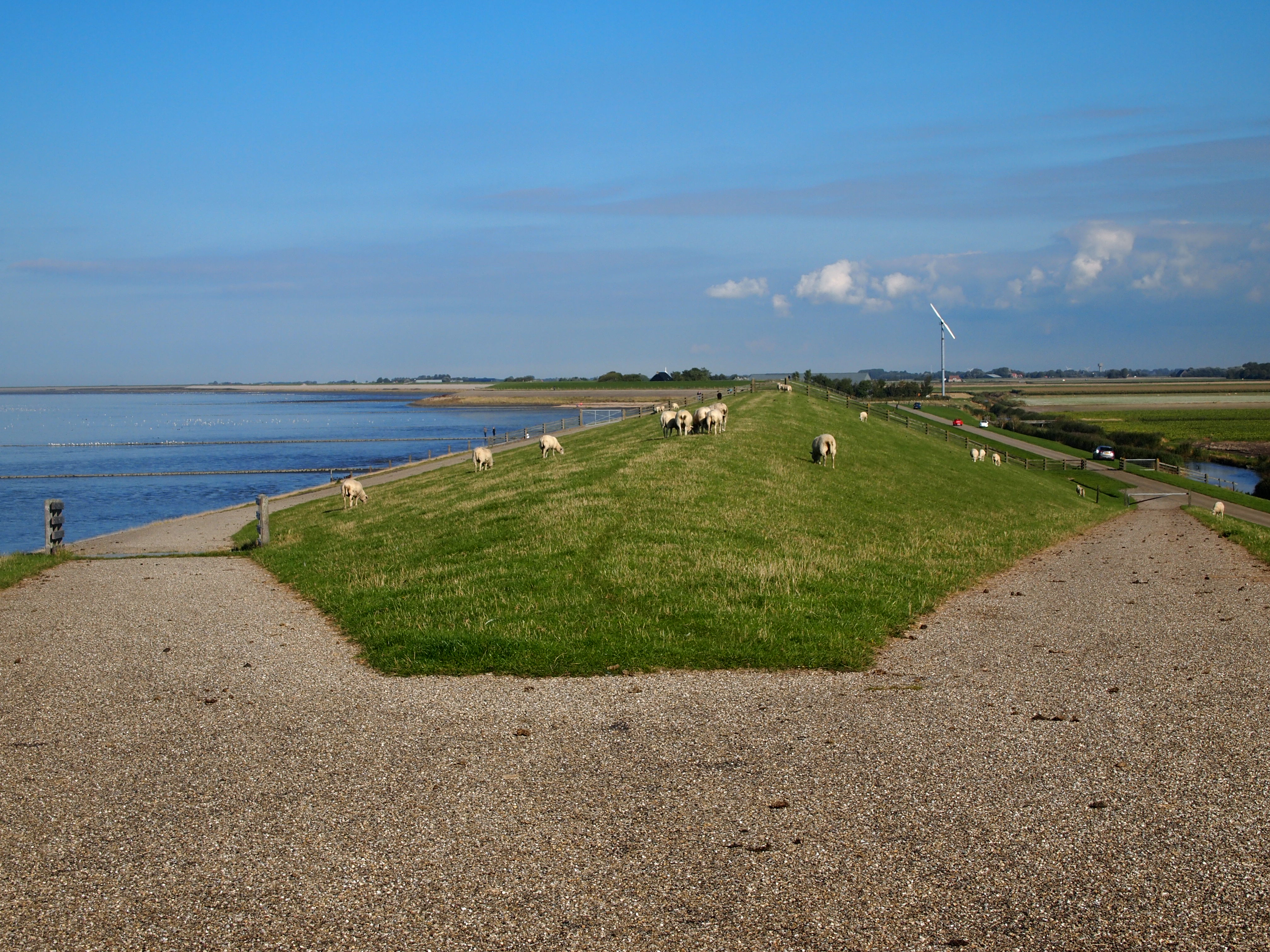
- On the causeway

- Flag Coat of arms

- Location in the Netherlands Westhoek (Netherlands)
- Country: Netherlands
- Province: Friesland
- Municipality: Waadhoeke

Area
  - Total: 3.87 km^{2} (1.49 sq mi)
- Elevation: 1.3 m (4.3 ft)

Population (2021)
  - Total: 255
  - Density: 65.9/km^{2} (171/sq mi)
- Time zone: UTC+1 (CET)
  - Summer (DST): UTC+2 (CEST)
- Postal code: 9075
- Dialing code: 0518

Westhoek (Bildts: De Westhoek) is a village in Waadhoeke in the province of Friesland, the Netherlands. It had a population of approximately 255 in 2021.

== History ==
Westhoek (western corner) is the western part of the Oudebildtdijk, which is the longest local road of the Netherlands with a length of 14 kilometres (8.7 mi). Westhoek is considered outside of the build-up area, however it does have place name signs and a 30 km/h speed limit. The dike was built in 1505 and het Bildt was poldered which became the last grietenij (predecessor of municipality) of Friesland. Around 1600, a new dike was constructed, and the old dike turned into a linear settlement.

Around 1960, Westhoek was planned to be demolished, because many of the houses and farms were in bad conditions or derelict, and were not connected to the sewage system, however tiny adverts were placed in the major daily newspapers by the slumlords offering cheap houses, Most buildings were quickly sold and subsequently restored.

Before 2018, the village was part of het Bildt municipality and before 1991 Westhoek was not a village but a hamlet which was part of the village Sint Jacobiparochie.

== Gallery ==
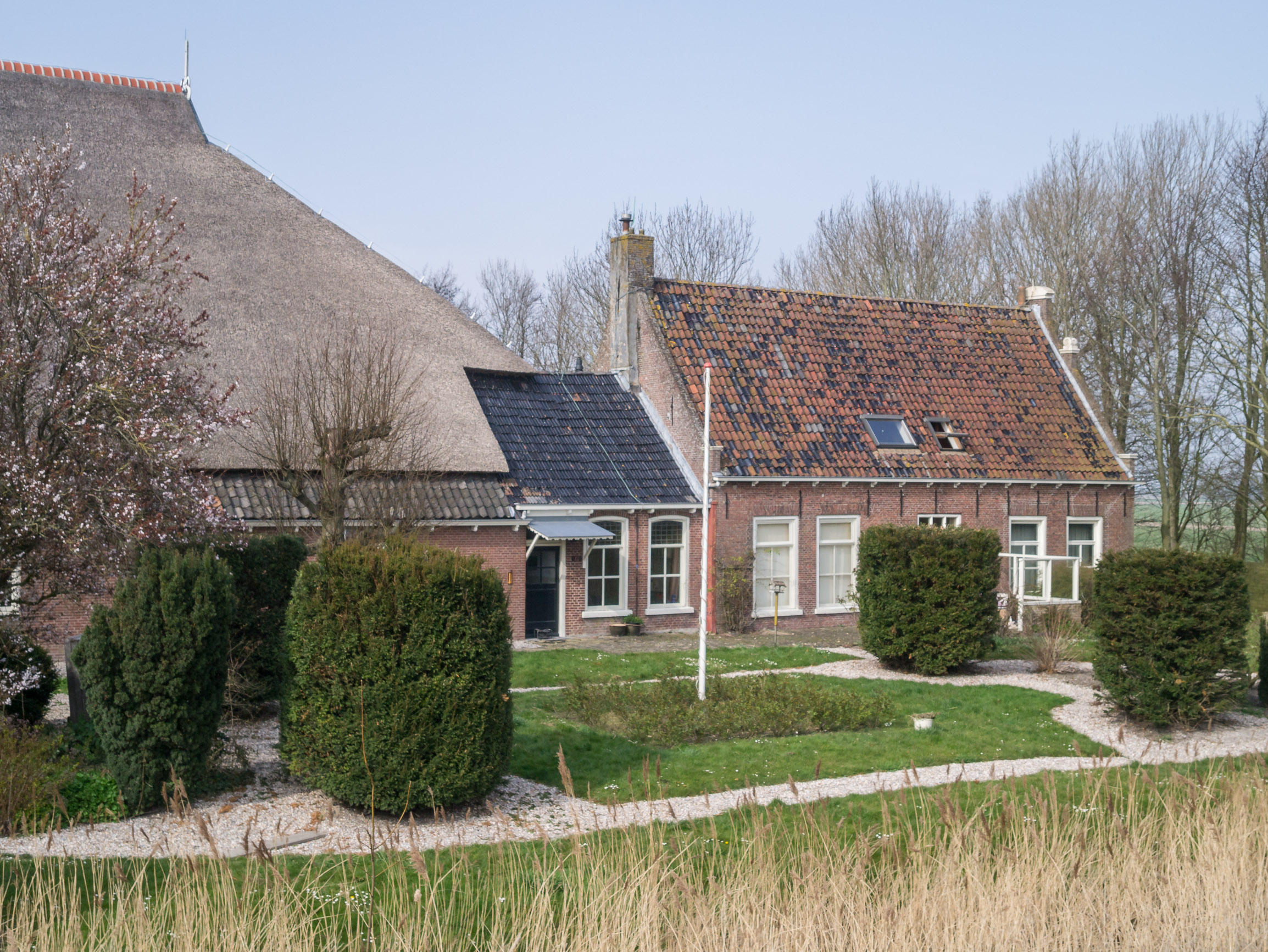
Farm in Westhoek

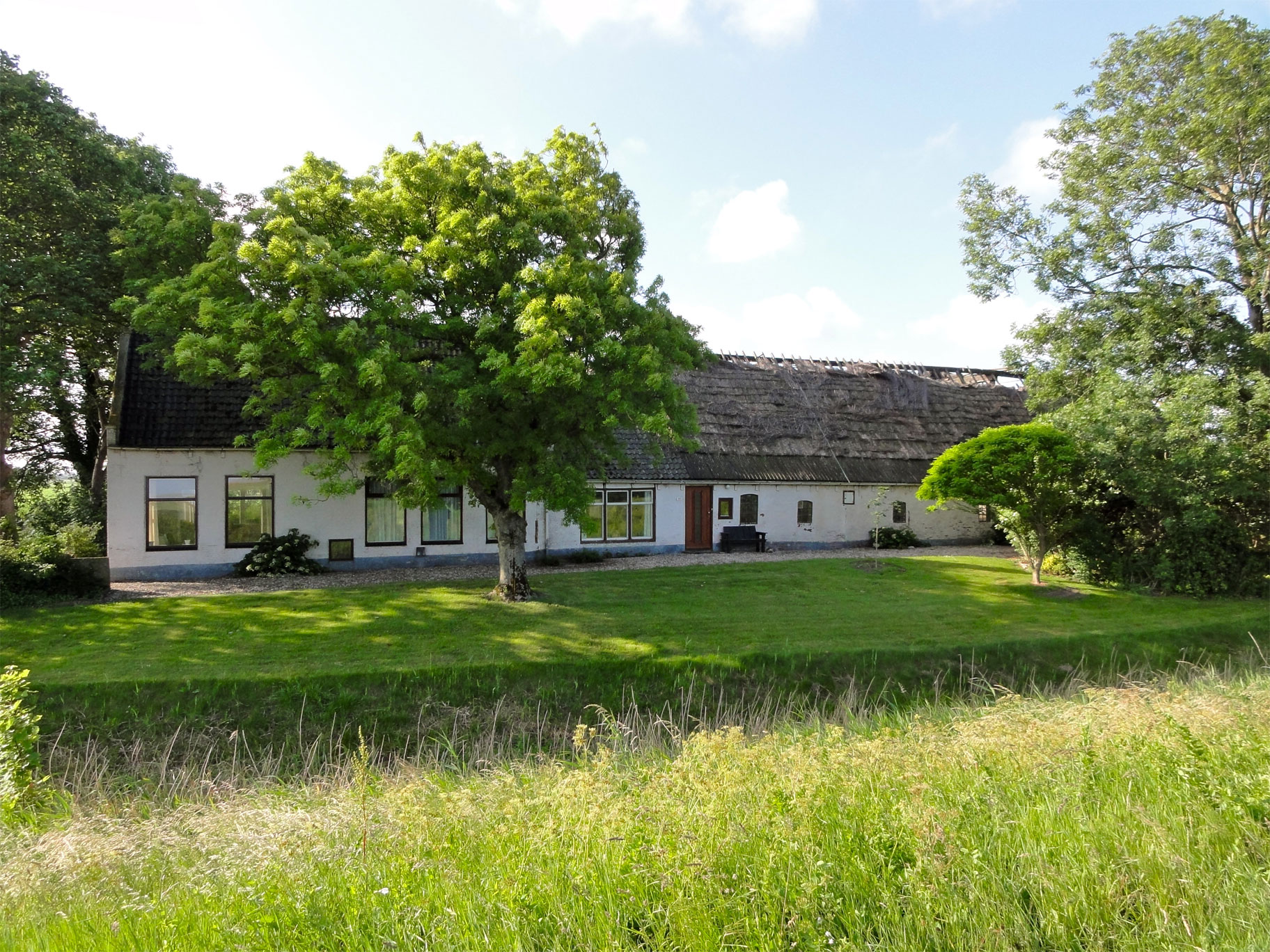
Farm in Westhoek

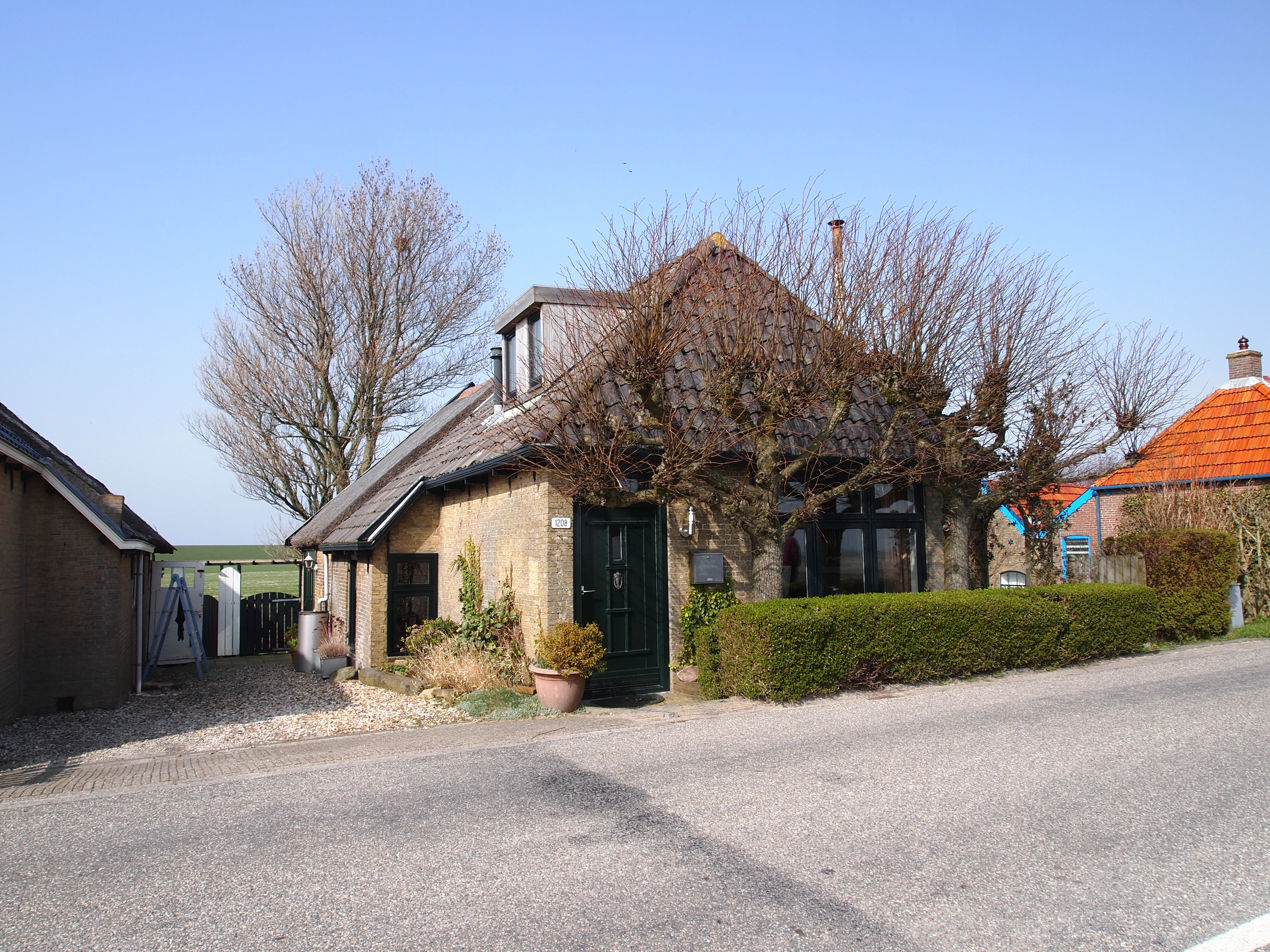
House in Westhoek

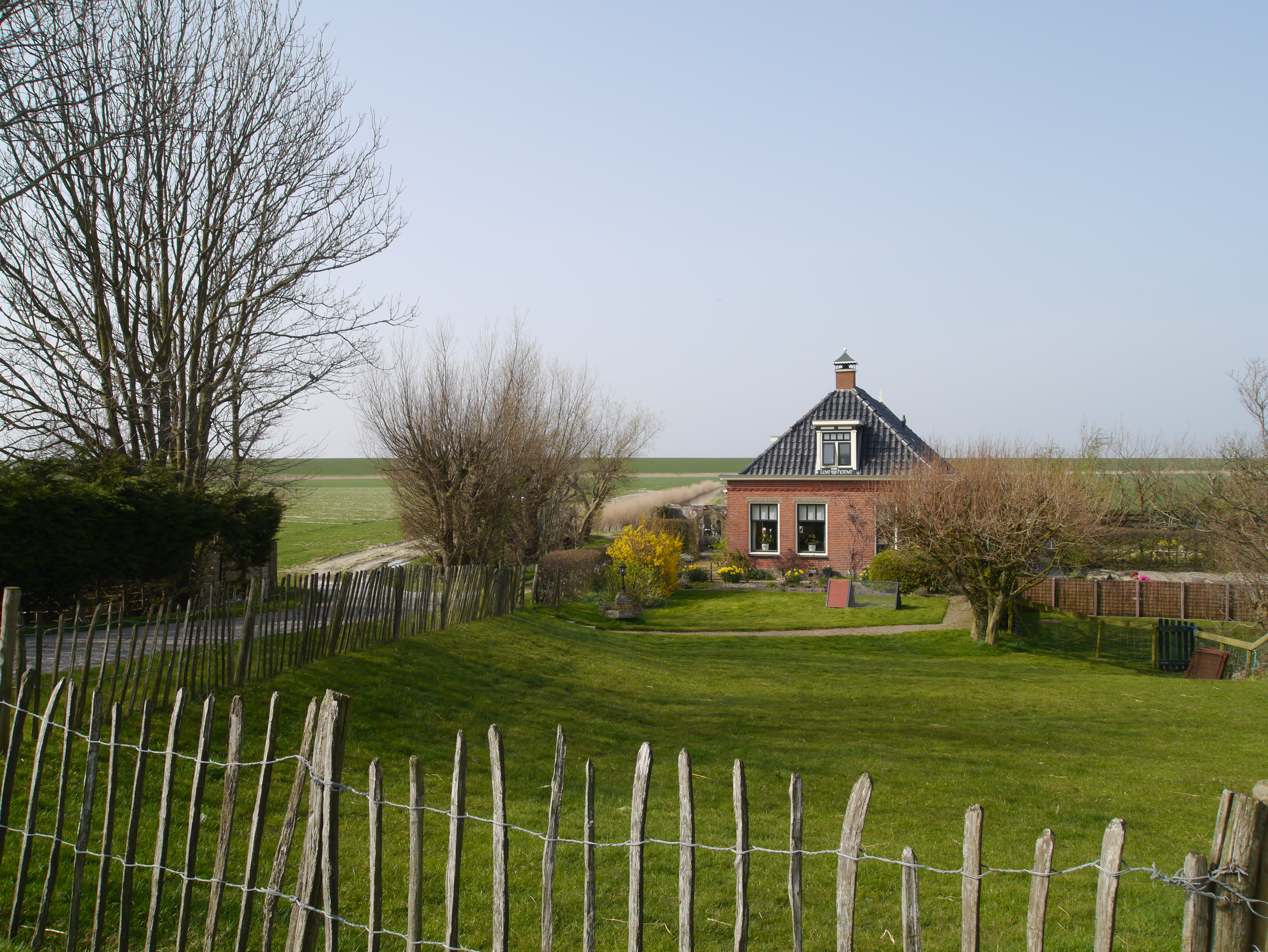
Farm Leye Hoeve
