= Westhoek =

Westhoek (Dutch for "west corner") can refer to the following places:

- Westhoek (region) a historical region in western Belgium and northern France
- Westhoek, sometimes referred to as Westland, South Holland, the area around Hook of Holland (Hoek van Holland)
- Westhoek, Friesland, a village in Het Bildt, Friesland, Netherlands
- Westhoek, North Brabant, a polder area near Willemstad (North Brabant) in Moerdijk, North Brabant, Netherlands
- Westhoek, Schouwen-Duiveland, a hamlet in Schouwen-Duiveland, Zeeland, Netherlands
- Westhoek, Walcheren, a neighborhood in Veere, Zeeland, Netherlands
