= Dirk Boonstra =

- Born: 24 February 1893; Sint Annaparochie, Netherlands
- Died: 9 September 1944 (aged 51); Hersbruck, Germany

Dirk Boonstra (24 February 1893 – 9 September 1944) was a police commander for the village of Grijpskerk in the Netherlands during World War II. For his refusal to carry out an order to round up the remaining Dutch Jews in the area he was recognized in 1988 as Righteous Among the Nations by the Yad Vashem.
