= Oudebildtzijl =

Oudebildtzijl Ouwe-Syl
- Village
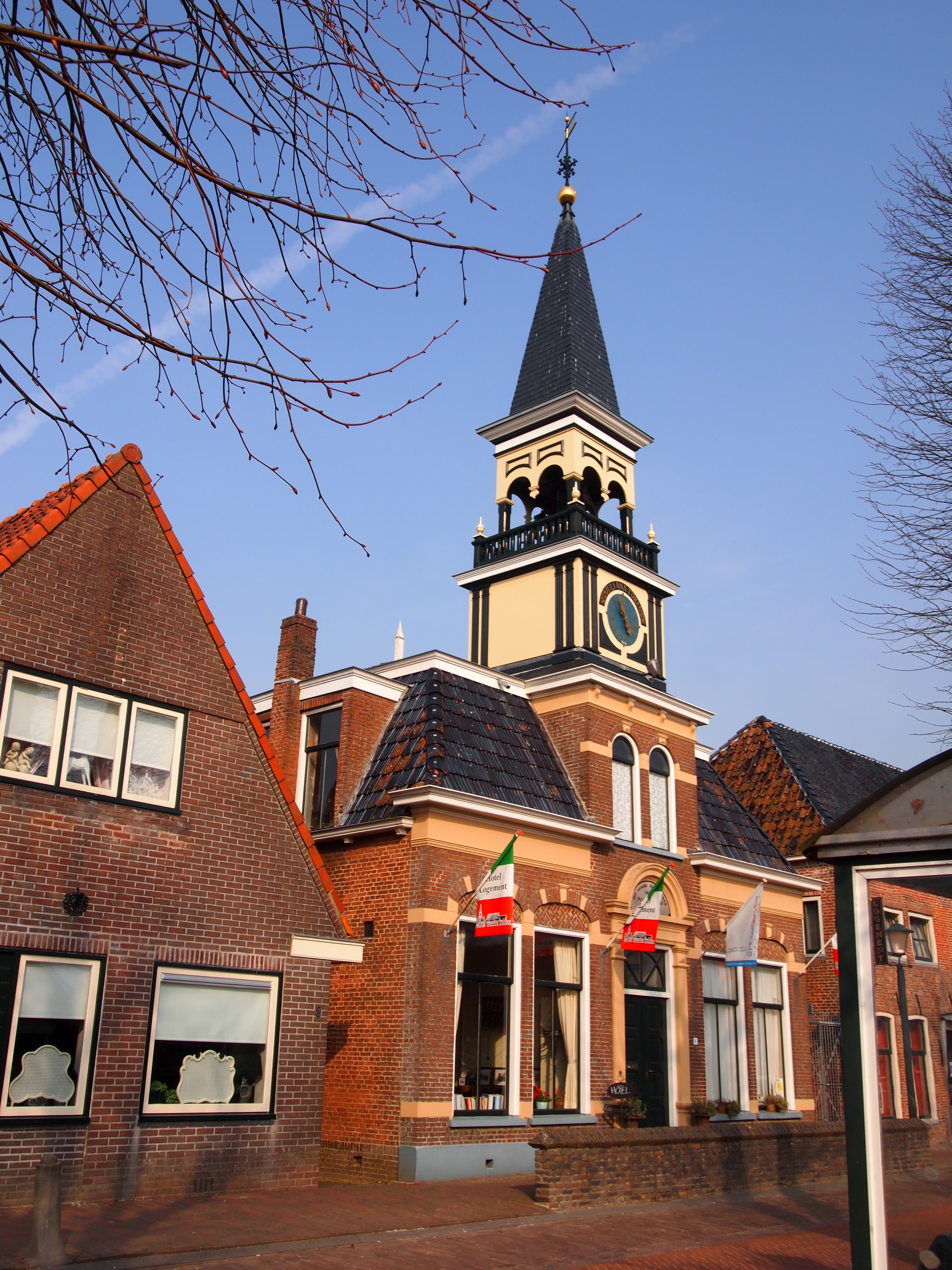
- Juliana church

- Flag Coat of arms

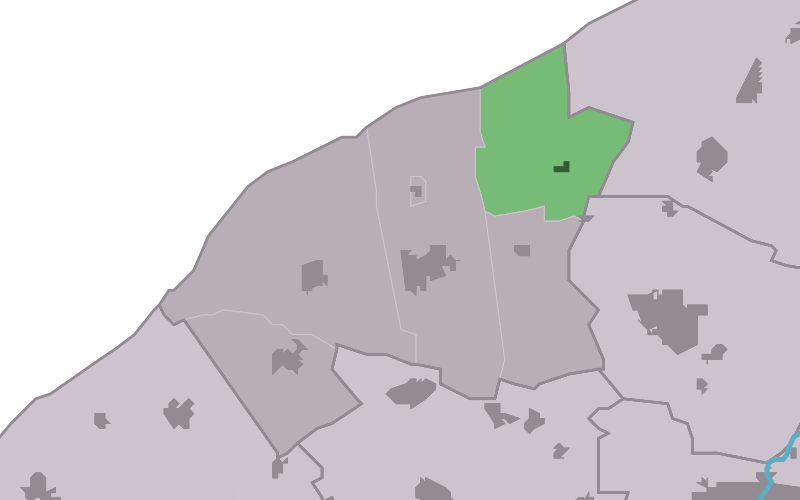
- Location in het Bildt municipality

- Location in the Netherlands Oudebildtzijl (Netherlands)
- Country: Netherlands
- Province: Friesland
- Municipality: Waadhoeke

Area
  - Total: 16.29 km^{2} (6.29 sq mi)
- Elevation: 1.3 m (4.3 ft)

Population (2021)
  - Total: 950
  - Density: 58/km^{2} (150/sq mi)
- Time zone: UTC+1 (CET)
  - Summer (DST): UTC+2 (CEST)
- Postal code: 9078
- Dialing code: 0518

Oudebildtzijl (Dutch: [ˌʌudəbɪltˈsɛil]; Bildts: Ouwe-Syl; West Frisian: Aldebiltsyl) is a village in Waadhoeke municipality in the province of Friesland, the Netherlands. It had a population of around 690 in January 2017.

It is the starting point from which the Oude Bildtdijk was created. Until 2018, the village was part of the het Bildt municipality.

== History ==
The village was first mentioned after 1570 as niuwe zijl, and means "sluice in the old Bildt. It refers to a sluice from 1505. In 1600, the Nieuwe Bildtdijk was constructed and oude (old) was added to distinguish from Nieuwebildtzijl. In 1504, a deal was struck between George, Duke of Saxony and four noblemen from Holland to polder the Middelzee. In 1505, a dike (Oude Bildtdijk) was constructed. The sluice was renewed in 1906.

In 1806, a Mennonite Church was built in Oudebildtzijl. In 1909, the church was enlarged and a clergy house with tower was added to the front. The Juliana tower is in neoclassic style with an open pavilion. The church was decommissioned in 1997, and nowadays serves as visitor centre for the nature area Aerden Plaats.

Oudebildtzijl was home to 604 people in 1840. In 1948, it became a village.

== Notable people ==
- Gerrit Keizer (1874-1946), freak show artist, singer and acrobat, because of his height of 80 cm. Performed around the world.

== Gallery ==
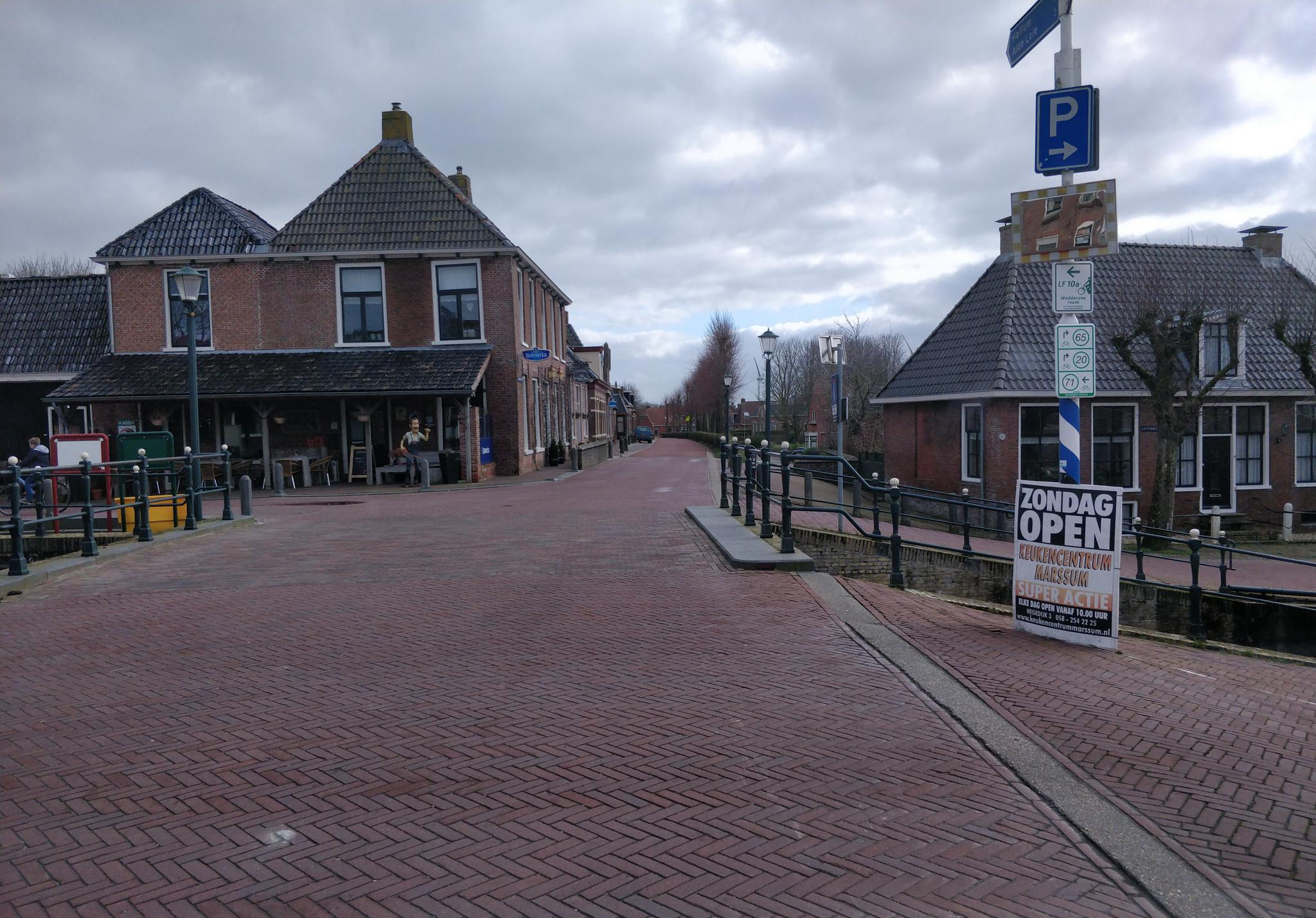
Street view

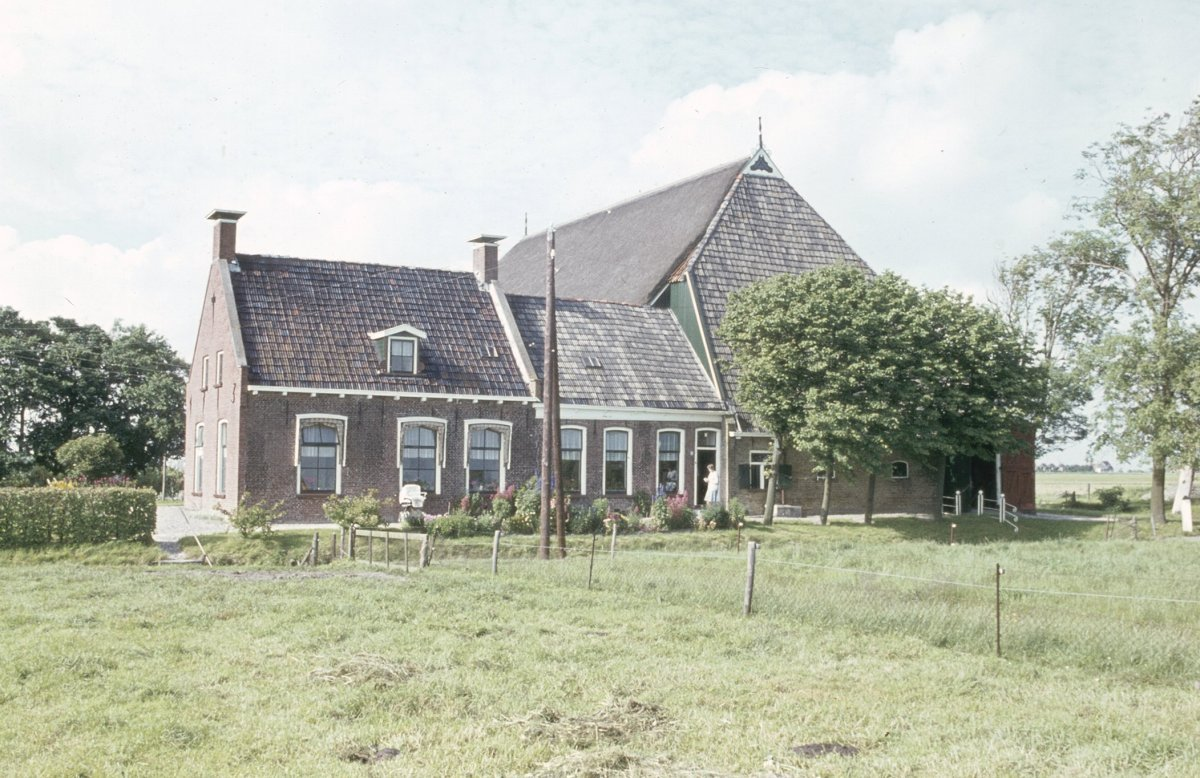
Farm in Oudebildtzijl

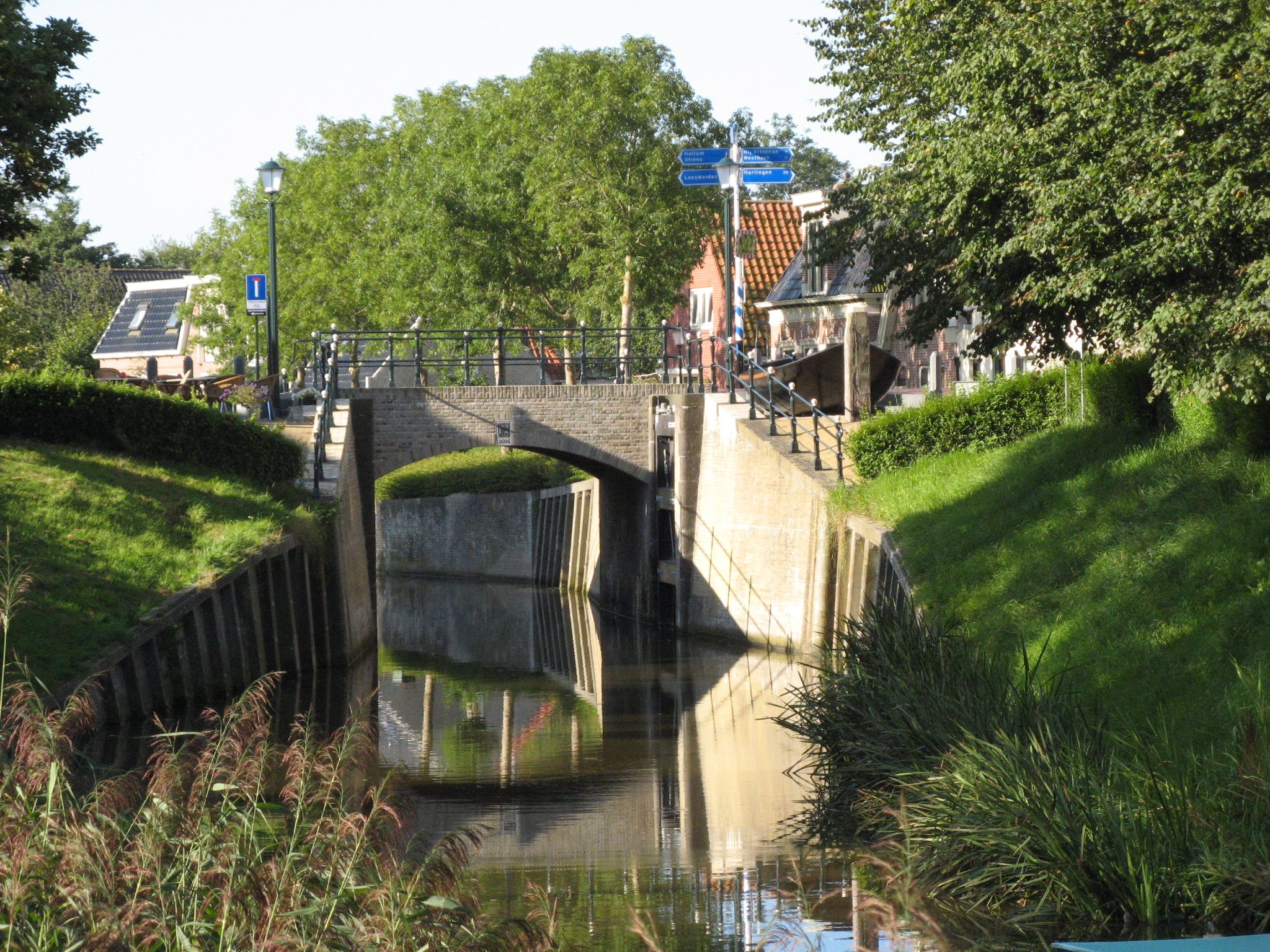
Canal view

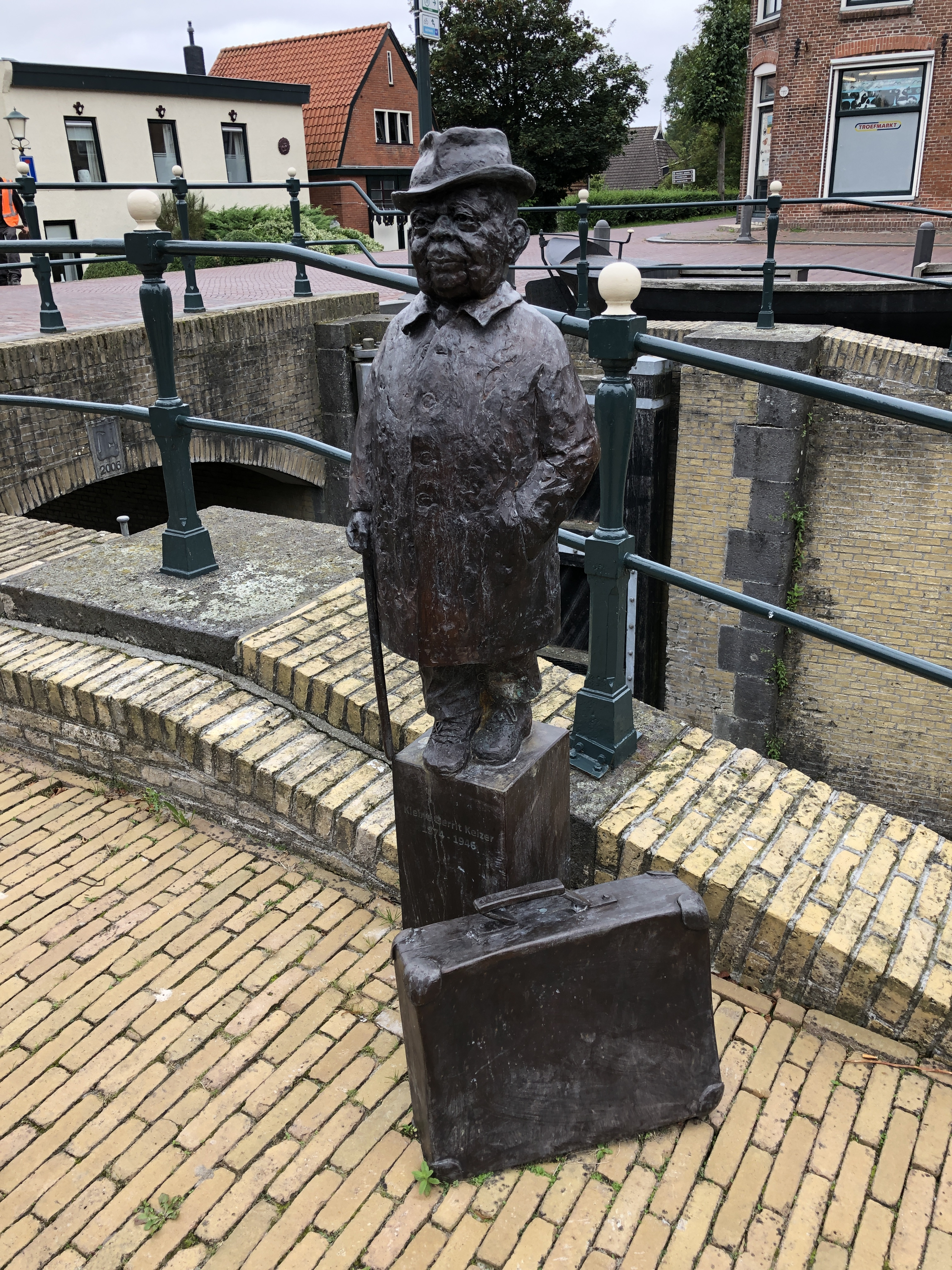
Statue of Gerrit Keizer
