= Ooster Bildtpollen =

Coordinates: 53.3°N 5.666667°E

Ooster Bildtpollen is the northern-east part of the Dutch county Het Bildt in Friesland. The dikework walling off the sea was completed in 1754. The western part is called the Wester Bildtpollen and the dike that protected these lands against the sea is called the "Nieuwe Bildtdijk". Just like the older dike, the Oude Bildtdijk the Nieuwe Bildtdijk lost its function. Halfway through the 20th century a new dike further out to sea was constructed. A narrow road now runs over the dikes and many houses and farmhouses are situated along this dike, mainly on the northern side.
