= Het Bildt =

het Bildt
- Municipality
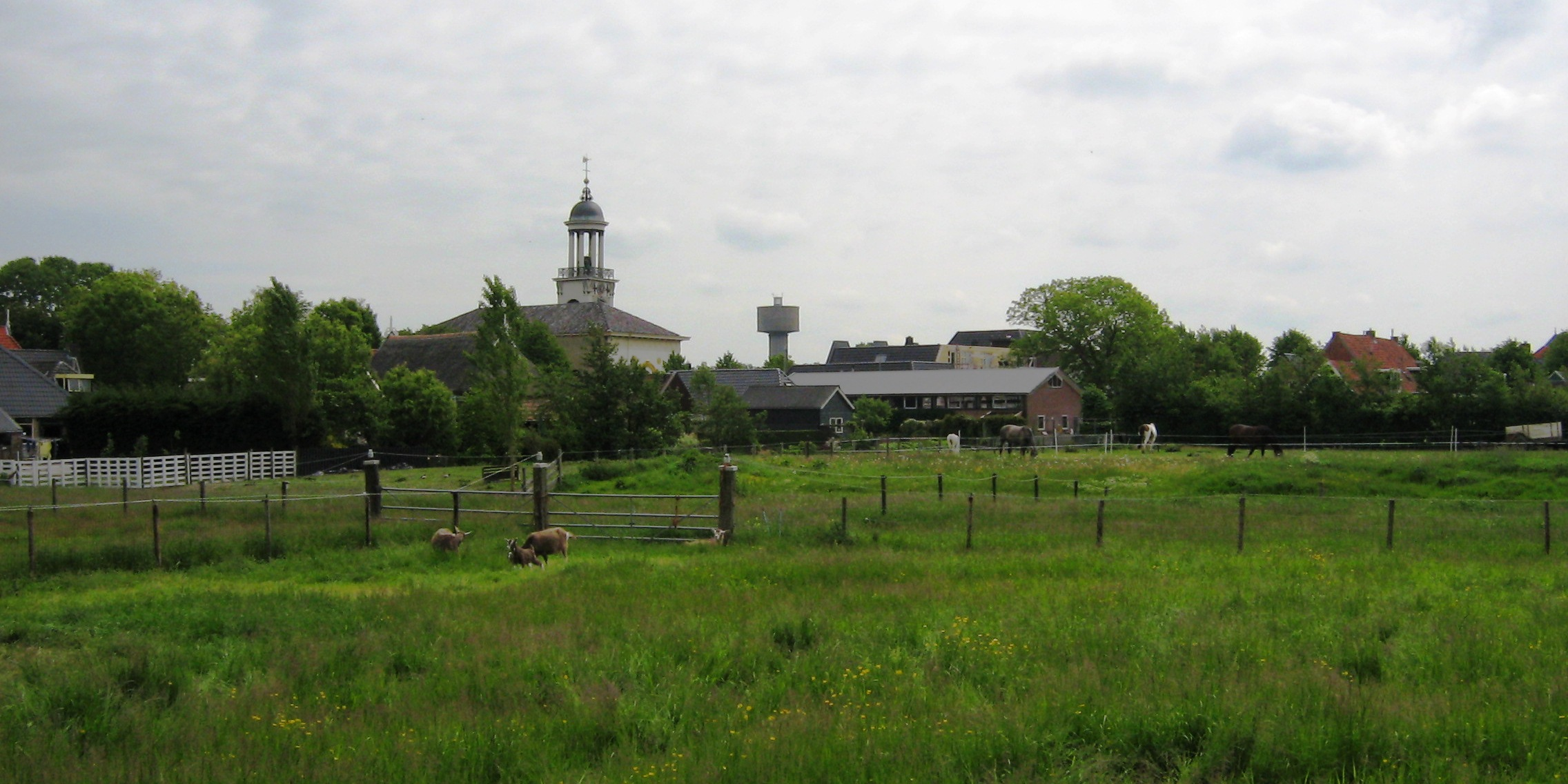
- Church and water tower of Sint Jacobiparochie

- Flag Coat of arms

- Location in Friesland
- Coordinates: 53°17′N 5°40′E
- Country: Netherlands
- Province: Friesland

Government
  - Body: Municipal council
  - Mayor: Gerrit Krol (CDA)

Area
  - Total: 116.48 km^{2} (44.97 sq mi)
  - Land: 92.37 km^{2} (35.66 sq mi)
  - Water: 24.11 km^{2} (9.31 sq mi)
- Elevation: 1 m (3.3 ft)
- Time zone: UTC+1 (CET)
  - Summer (DST): UTC+2 (CEST)
- Postcode: 9047, 9075–9079
- Area code: 0518
- Website: www.hetbildt.nl

het Bildt (Dutch: [ɦɛd ˈbɪlt] or [əd ˈbɪlt]) is a former municipality in the province of Friesland in the northern Netherlands; its capital was Sint Annaparochie. On 1 January 2018 it merged with the municipalities of Franekeradeel, Menameradiel and parts of Littenseradiel to form the new municipality Waadhoeke.

Het Bildt has 15.4 km (9.6 mi) of coastline. Its soil is very fertile and agriculture is a major part of its economy; crops grown include onions, potatoes, and a variety of fruits (mainly apples). Het Bildt was largely settled by Dutch inhabitants from South Holland; as a result, the language generally spoken there is "Bildts", a dialect that mixes Dutch (as spoken in South Holland) with West Frisian; Bildts is usually classified as a dialect of Dutch. All three languages - Bildts, Dutch, and West Frisian - are spoken in the area. Only in Minnertsga (which did not become a part of the municipality of Het Bildt until 1984) is West Frisian the predominant language. Signage in Het Bildt is generally bilingual, with names given in both Dutch and Bildts.

The name Het Bildt is formed out of the word opbilden which means the silting up of land.

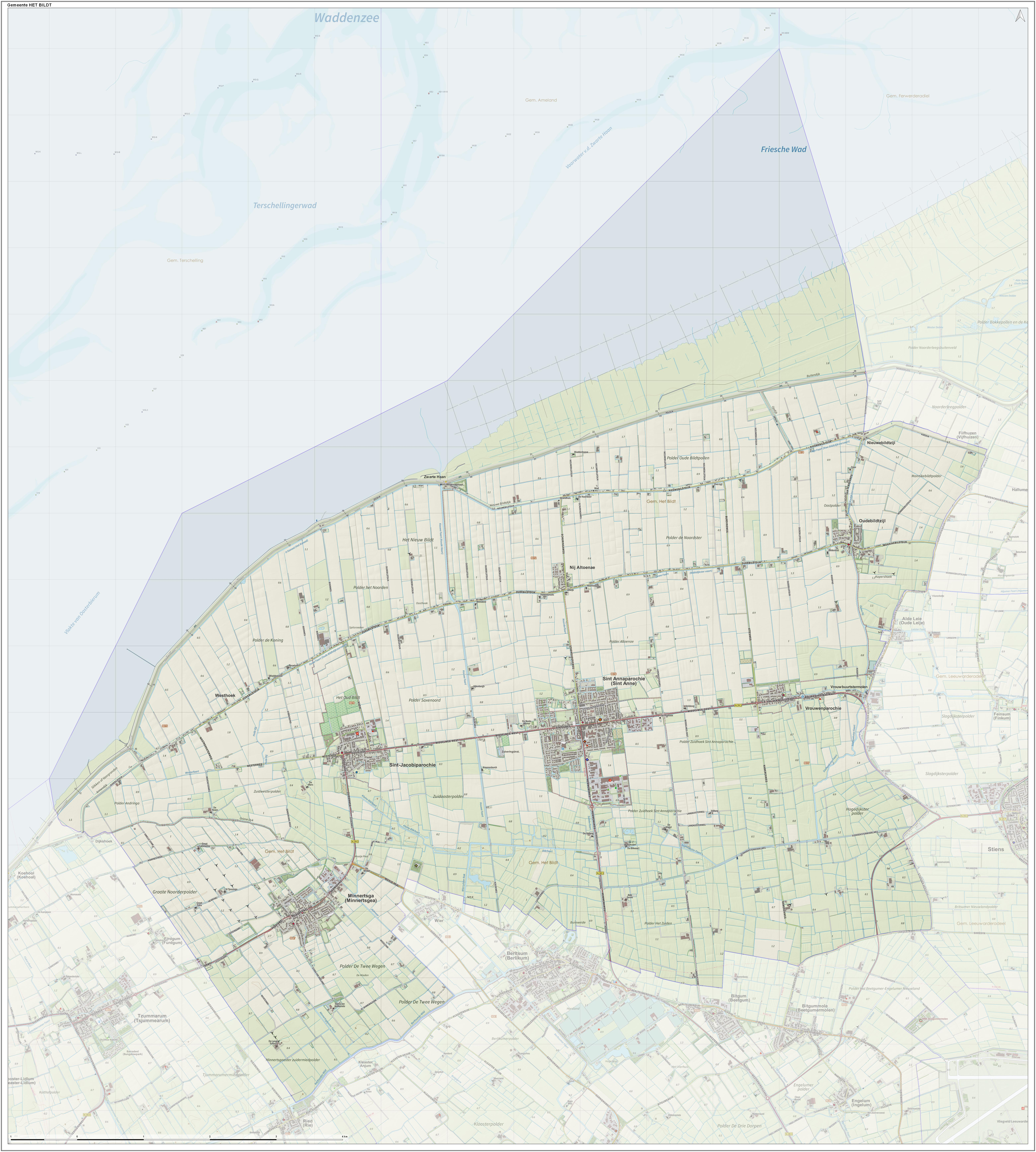
Dutch topographic map of the municipality of Het Bildt, June 2015.

== Population centres ==
Number of inhabitants as of 1 January 2004:

Dutch name	Bildts name	West Frisian name	Population
Sint Annaparochie	Sint-Anne	Sint Anne	3990
Minnertsga	Minnertska	Minnertsgea	1640
Sint Jacobiparochie	Sint-Jabik	Sint Jabik	1370
Oudebildtzijl	Ouwe-Syl	Aldebildtsyl	740
Vrouwenparochie	Froubuurt	Froubuorren	620
Nij Altoenae	Nij Altoenae	Nij Altena	280
Westhoek	De Westhoek	De Westhoek	280

Source: CBS

== History ==
The region now called Het Bildt was formed out of a sea called the Middelsee (or Bordine) and was at one time subject to serious floods. The Middlesee once separated the western lands from the rest of the Frisian mainland. The western part was called Westergoa and the city of Franeker was in its center. The eastern part was called Eastergoa. The city Leeuwarden was located along Eastergoa's western coast. The Middelsee stretched all the way from the north to the west of Bolsward. Earlier it extended still further, all the way to the Zuiderzee (now het IJsselmeer) and Westergoa was an Island only accessible by boat. Around 1300 the sea began to become less accessible to boats. Eventually a dike was raised between the villages Beetgumermolen and Britsum to stop the continuous overflooding. As a result, the area south of this dike was no longer subject to the effects of tides and the parts that weren't already dry became solid land. Westergo and Oostergo were connected. The Swette has been kept as a small river between Leeuwarden and Sneek. After the dike was raised, the northern part of the Middelsee also gradually silted. In 1398 the newly reclaimed dry lands were given by the Duke Albert I of Bavaria to Arnold I, Lord of Egmond, Lord of IJsselstein. In 1498, even more land became dry. This trend, caused by the Waddenzee's tide, has continued to the present.

The new dry land consisted of two regions, called "Het Grote Bildt" and "Het Kleine Bildt", and both came under the ownership of the Saxon duke Albert of Saxony-Meissen. He seriously considered converting the whole region into solid dry land but he was out of funds and died within a few years in 1504. The Saxon control of Friesland was by no means secure and was continually threatened by revolts in that province. Consequently, Albert's successor Heinrich of Saxony, who was of a rather inert disposition, relinquished his claims to the governorship, and in 1505 an agreement was made between Albert's two sons by which Friesland was transferred to Heinrich's brother, George of Saxony, while Heinrich received an annuity and the districts of Freiberg and Wolkenstein.

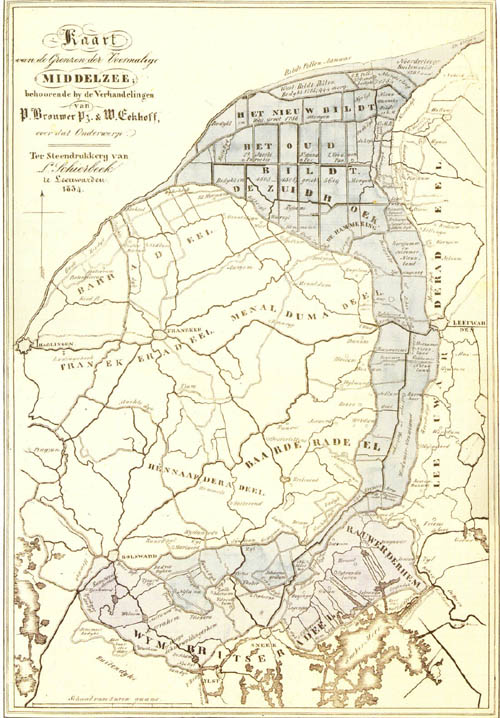
Map of the Middelzee from 1834.

In June 1505, Duke George of Saxony signed an eleven-year farming-lease-agreement with the noble brothers from South Holland, Dirk van Wijngaarden, Floris van Wijngaarden, and Jakob Oem van Wijngaarden, and their brother in law Thomas Beukelaar. The brothers started the project in 1505 but in the years that followed the dykes they had laid could still not prevent the tides from flooding the land. After receiving money from George of Saxony and hiring the help of two nobles, misters Davelaer and Bontemantel, they accomplished the immense task of dyking the area properly. "Het Bildt" was diked by a 14-kilometre-long (8.7 mi) dike which was fashioned purely by hand, spade, boats, and mud. This work was accomplished by many workmen from three Dutch provinces: South Holland, Zeeland, and Friesland. The area was mathematically planned and consists of straight, parallel roads pointing from south to north or east to west.

Along the main road three villages were formed. They are named Wijngaarden, Altoenae, and Kijfhoek, after the villages (Wijngaarden, Altoenae and Kijfhoek) in South Holland, the province from which most of the workers came. In time the villages formed Catholic parishes (parochie) and the names of these parishes eventually were used as the names for these villages. Since then the villages have been called Sint Jacobiparochie, Sint Annaparochie and Vrouwenparochie. George of Saxony was unable to suppress the revolts of the Schieringers and Gelderschen (who formed a pact) and in 1514 he was required to hand over the whole Bildt area to the Count of Holland and Zeeland, with the permission of Charles V, the Holy Roman Emperor.

When the "Republic of the Seven United Netherlands" fought and freed itself from Spain, Het Bildt became the 29th county of Friesland. Eventually, it was decided that the area north of the dike would also be diked; this was done in 1600. The new dike was called the "Nieuwe Bildtdijk" and the old 14-kilometer-long dike was called "Oude Bildtdijk". The area in between was called "Nij Bildt" and in 1637 was sold because the Frisian province was short on money. It is claimed that the Frisian farmhouses which can be seen throughout Friesland originated in Het Bildt. The former South Holland province inhabitants brought the design with them and it was later exploited for use all over the Frisian province (though the typical Bildts farmhouses do vary from Frisian farmhouses). In 1715 another western area was diked, named the "Wester Bildtpollen". On 12 March 1751 the rest of this area was also sold. In 1754 the eastern part, the "Ooster Bildtpollen" was diked.

Today the "Oude Bildtdijk" and the "Nieuwe Bildtdijk" are both covered with roads and houses; the road that runs across the old 14 kilometer long dike is the longest in the Netherlands.
