= Frisian farmhouse =

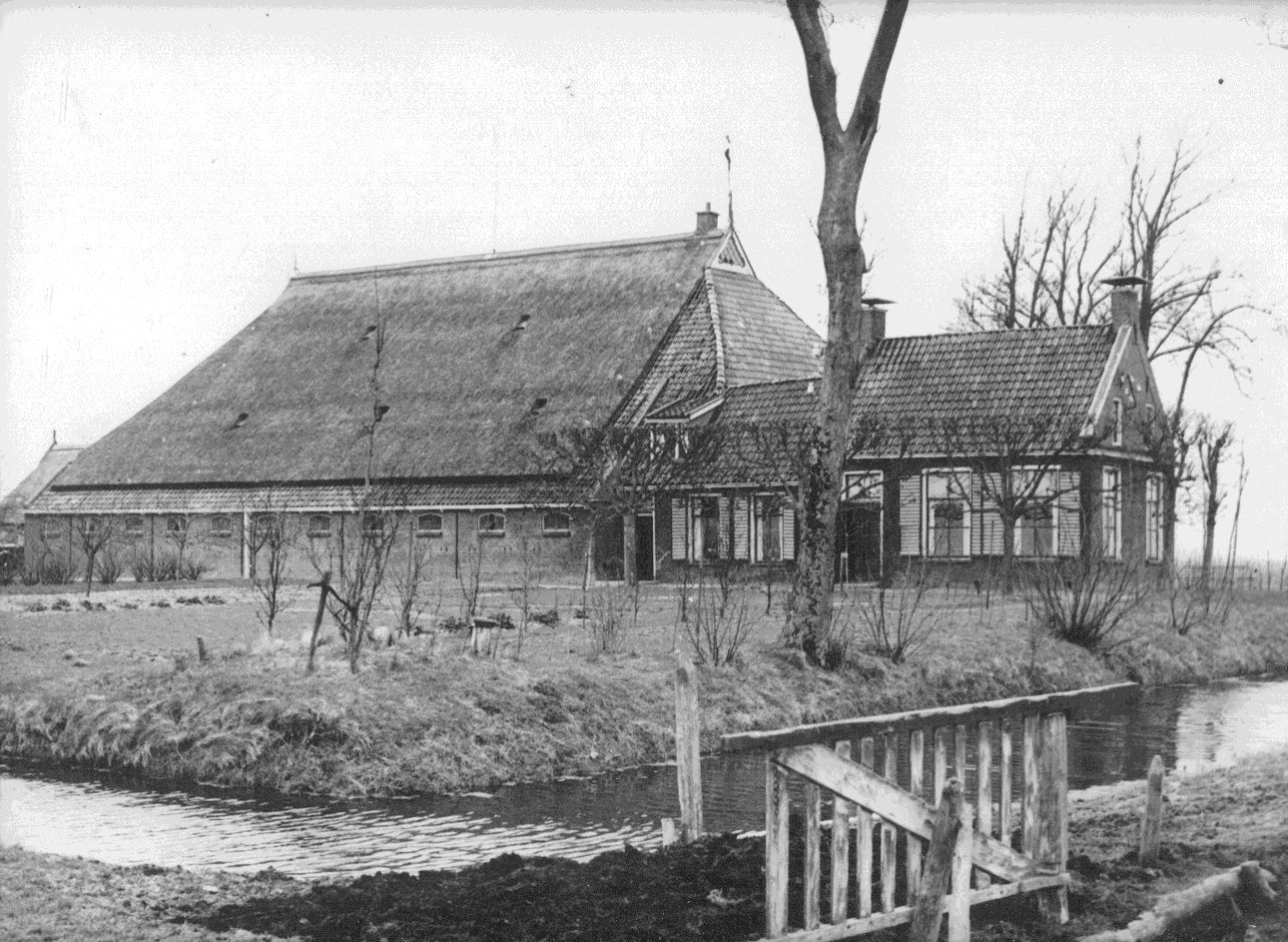
A typical Frisian Head-Neck-Body farmhouse

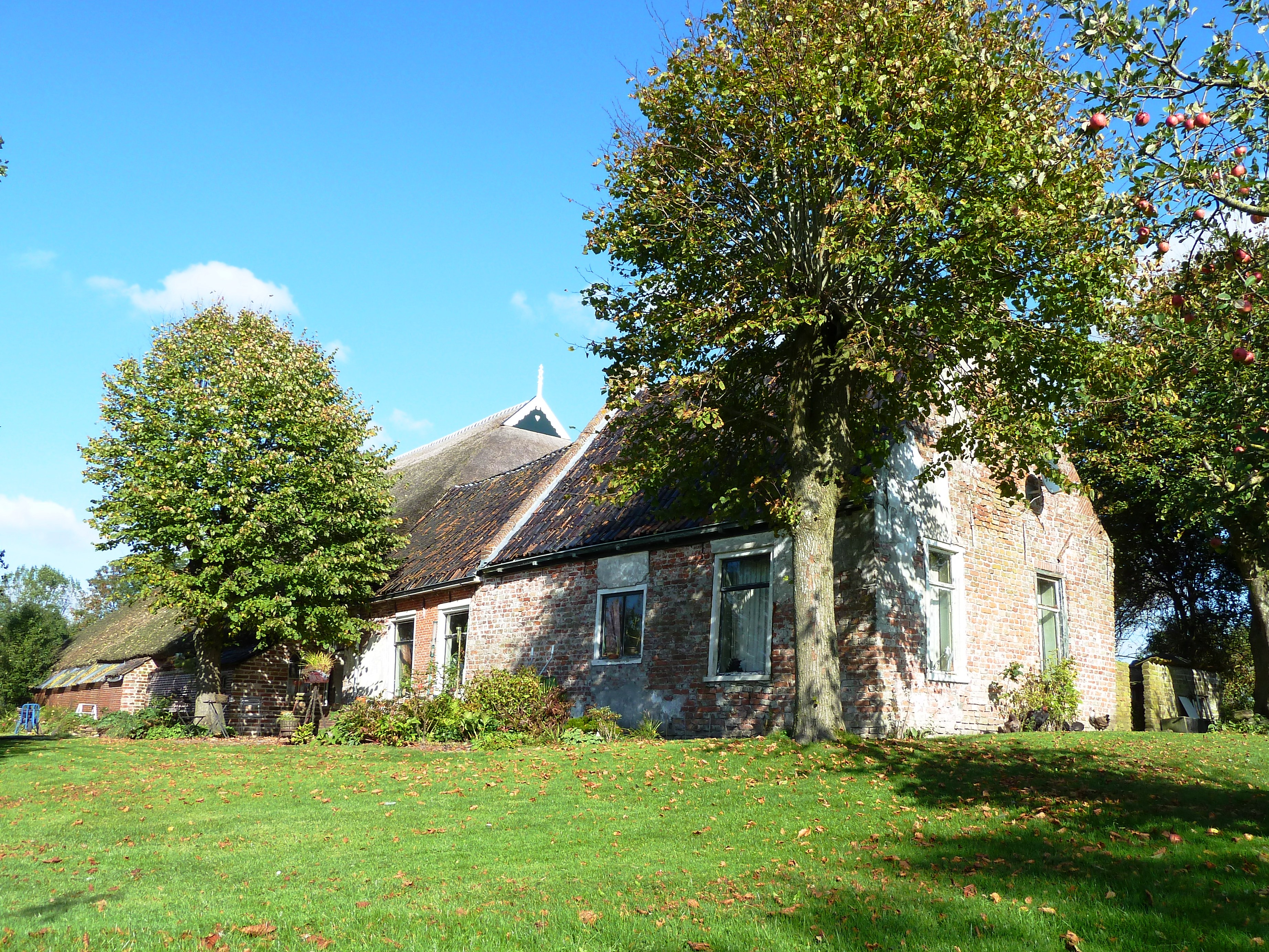
Head-neck-rump farm with moat, possibly built in the first half of the 16th century

A "Head-Neck-Body farmhouse" (Dutch: kop-hals-rompboerderij) or Head-Neck-Rump farmhouse is a typical Frisian farmhouse. It consists of a residence (the head) and a kitchen (the neck) placed in line in front of a big shed (the body). A striking fact is that the residence was never built in the centre front of the shed – this has to do with the origin of this type of farmhouse from a smaller type of farmhouse that has now disappeared.

The medieval Old Frisian longhouse (or byre dwelling) consisted of a residence with a byre for cattle built immediately behind it. The harvest was stacked in the attic or in open barns which were logically located near the livestock quarters.

The Frisian farm (a farmhouse with an attached Frisian barn or Gulfscheune) can be found in Friesland and Groningen It must be distinguished from the Haubarg in North Holland and Schleswig-Holstein (with living quarters integrated in the barn), and the Oldambt farm, which in Germany is also called the Ostfriesenhaus or Gulf house.

== Origin ==
Due to the development of better harvesting materials at the beginning of the 16th century there was a need for more storage space for the harvest. This was solved by building a bigger shed behind the 'head and neck' of the original farmhouse.

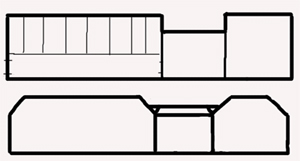
Drawing of an earlier "longhouse type"

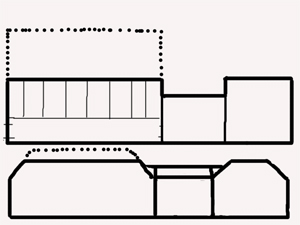
Drawing of an earlier "longhouse type" in evolution

== Het Bildt ==
Although sometimes considered as ethnically Frisian, early examples of the Frisian barn can be found in many other regions, including the newly embanked arable district of Het Bildt, where colonists from the County of Holland settled in the 16th century. Characteristic of the older farmhouses in Het Bildt is the L‑shaped layout, in which the living quarters are positioned at right angles to the barn, with the byre located against the short gable of the barn. As a result, the byre — just as in the longhouse type — extends in line with the dwelling. This layout may have been derived from similar farmhouses in the Rhine-Meuse-delta, from where some of the colonists originated.

== Gallery ==
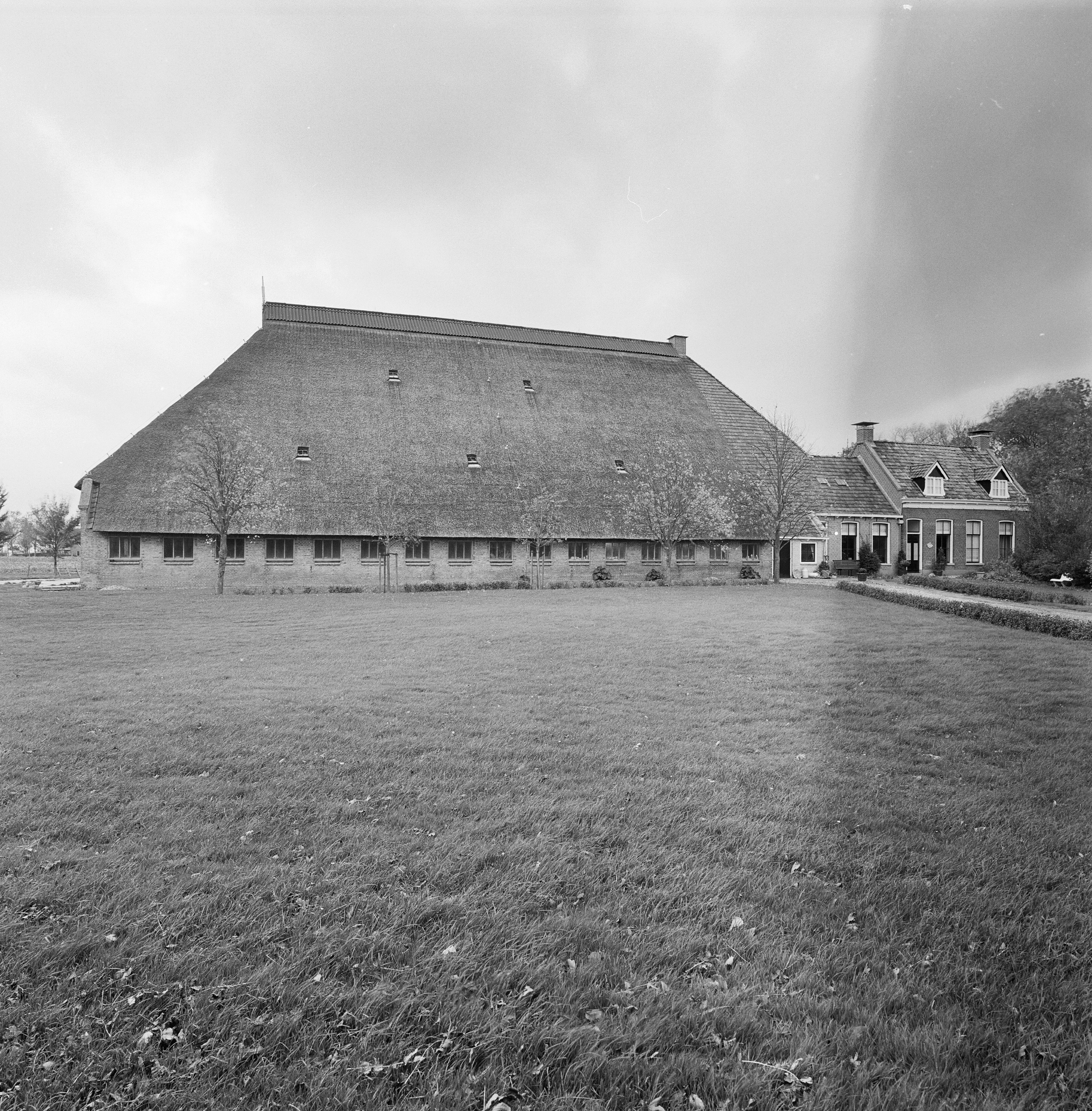
Exterior of a headneck trunk farm

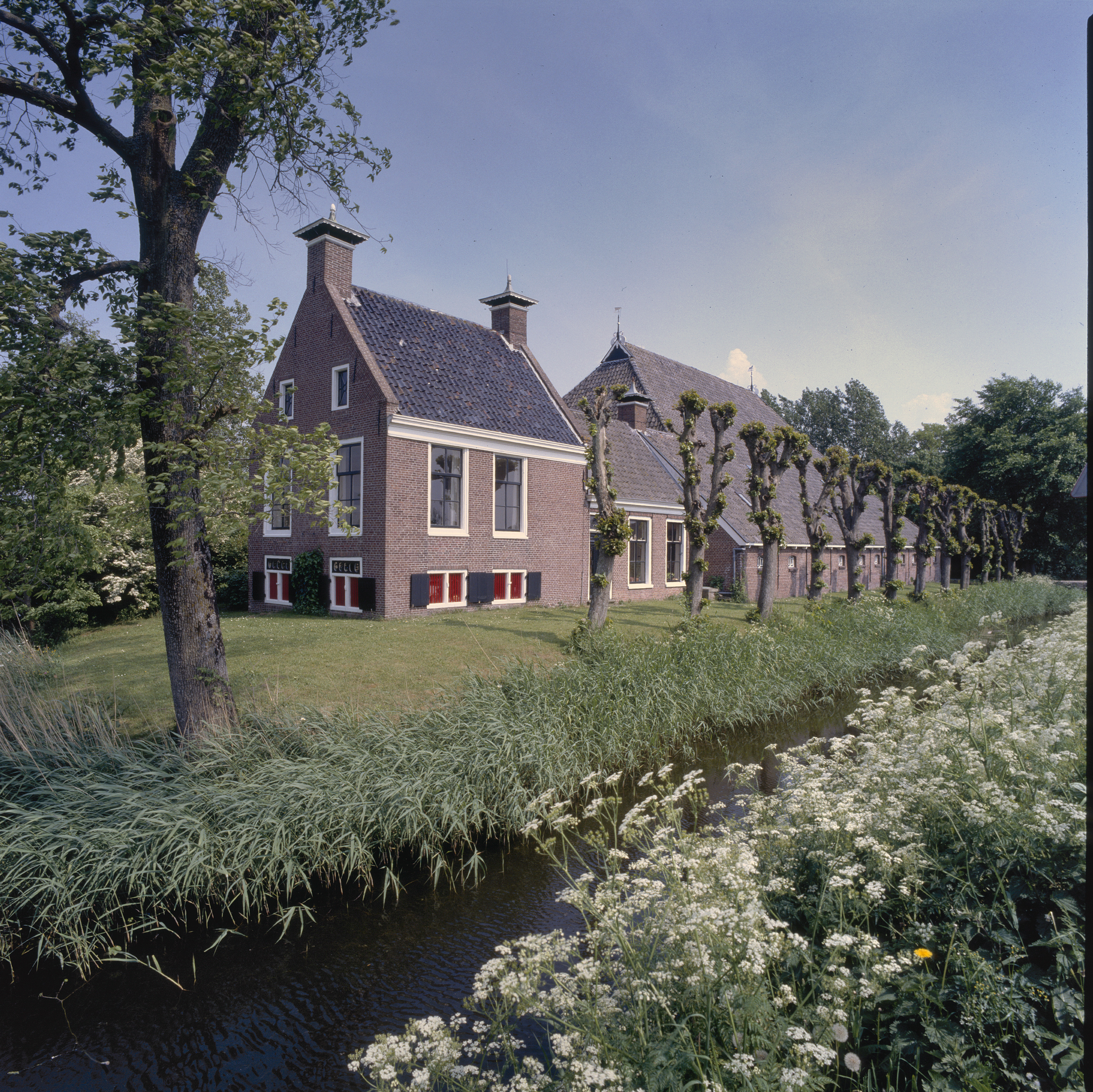
View of facade and right side wall, farm at Boksum, Netherlands

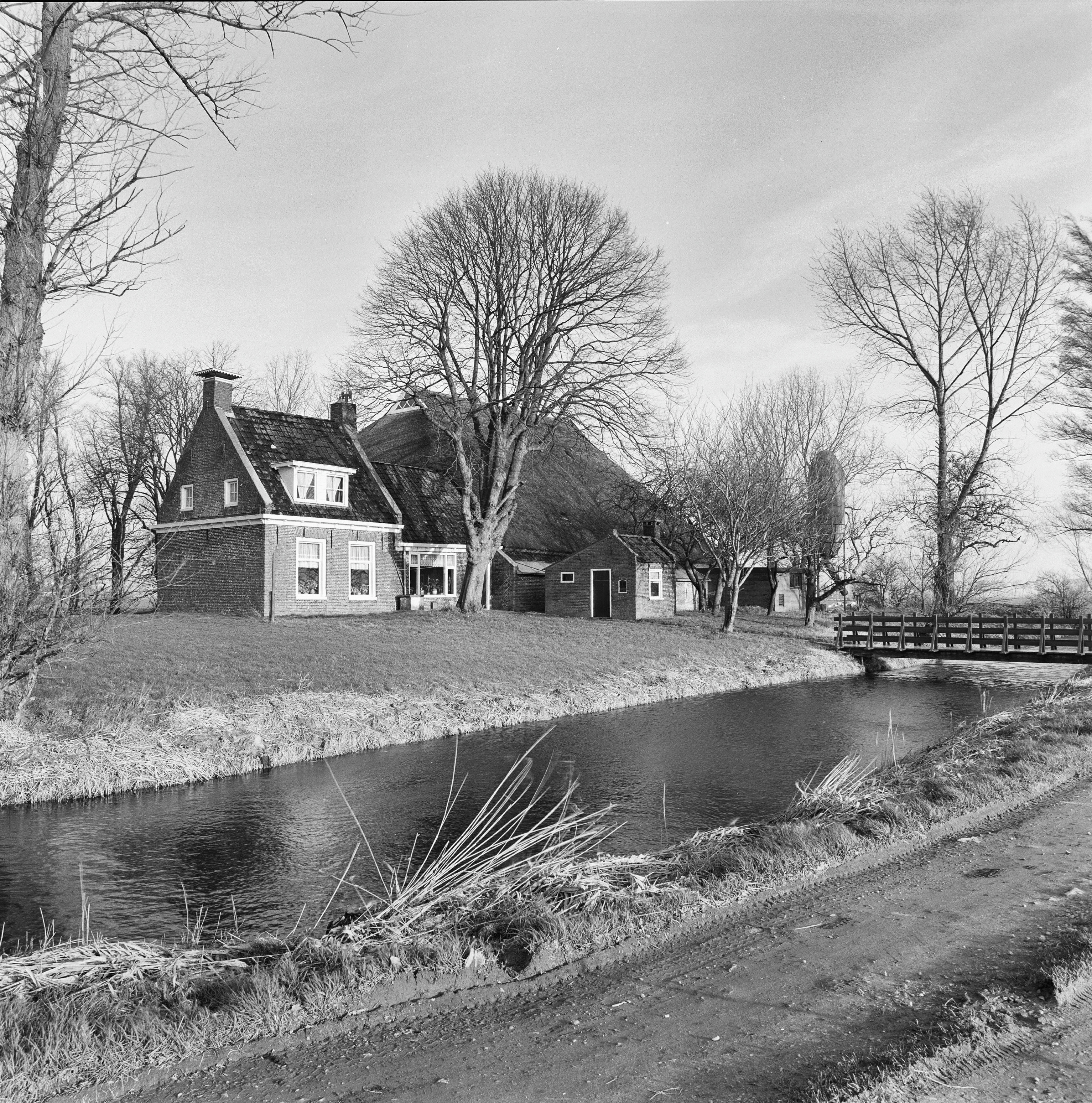
House and barn, Burum, Netherlands

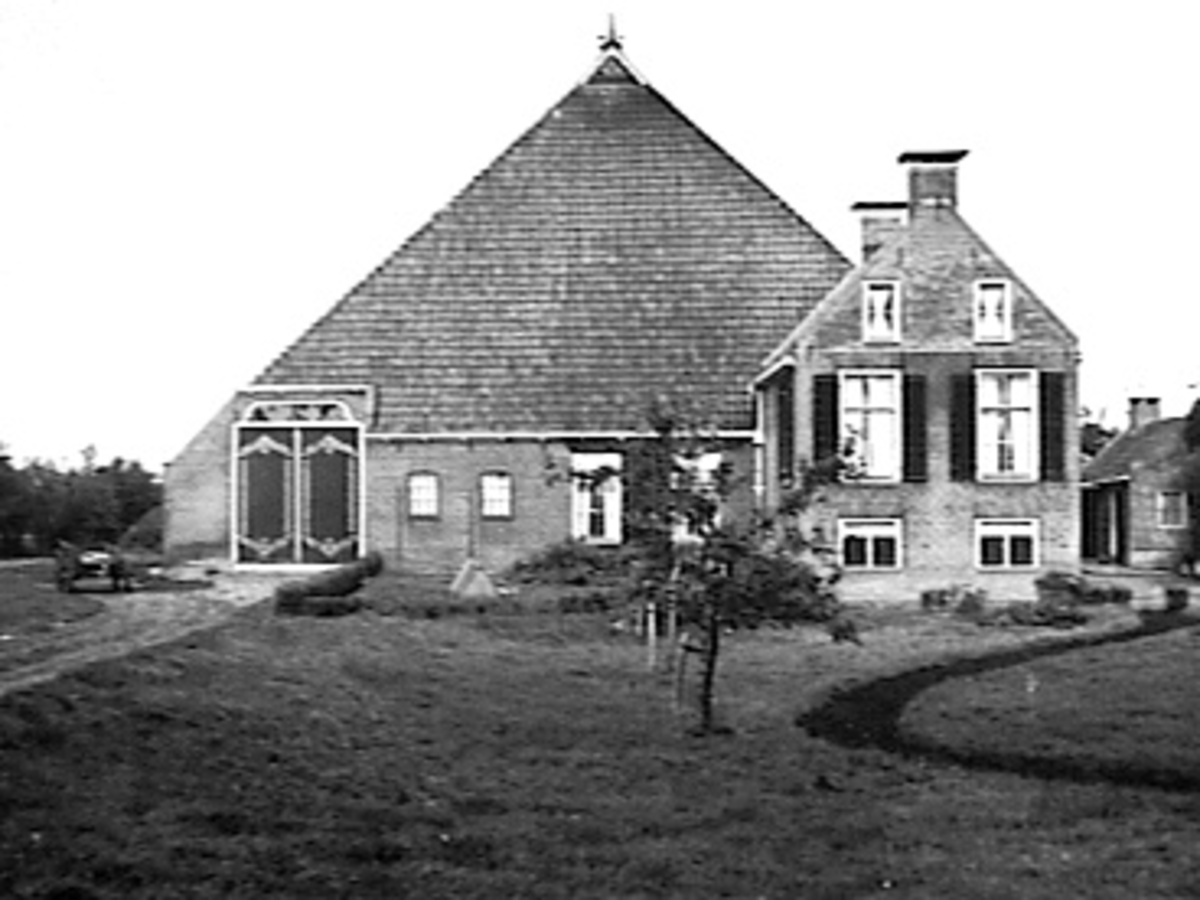
Frisian farmhouse, Netherlands

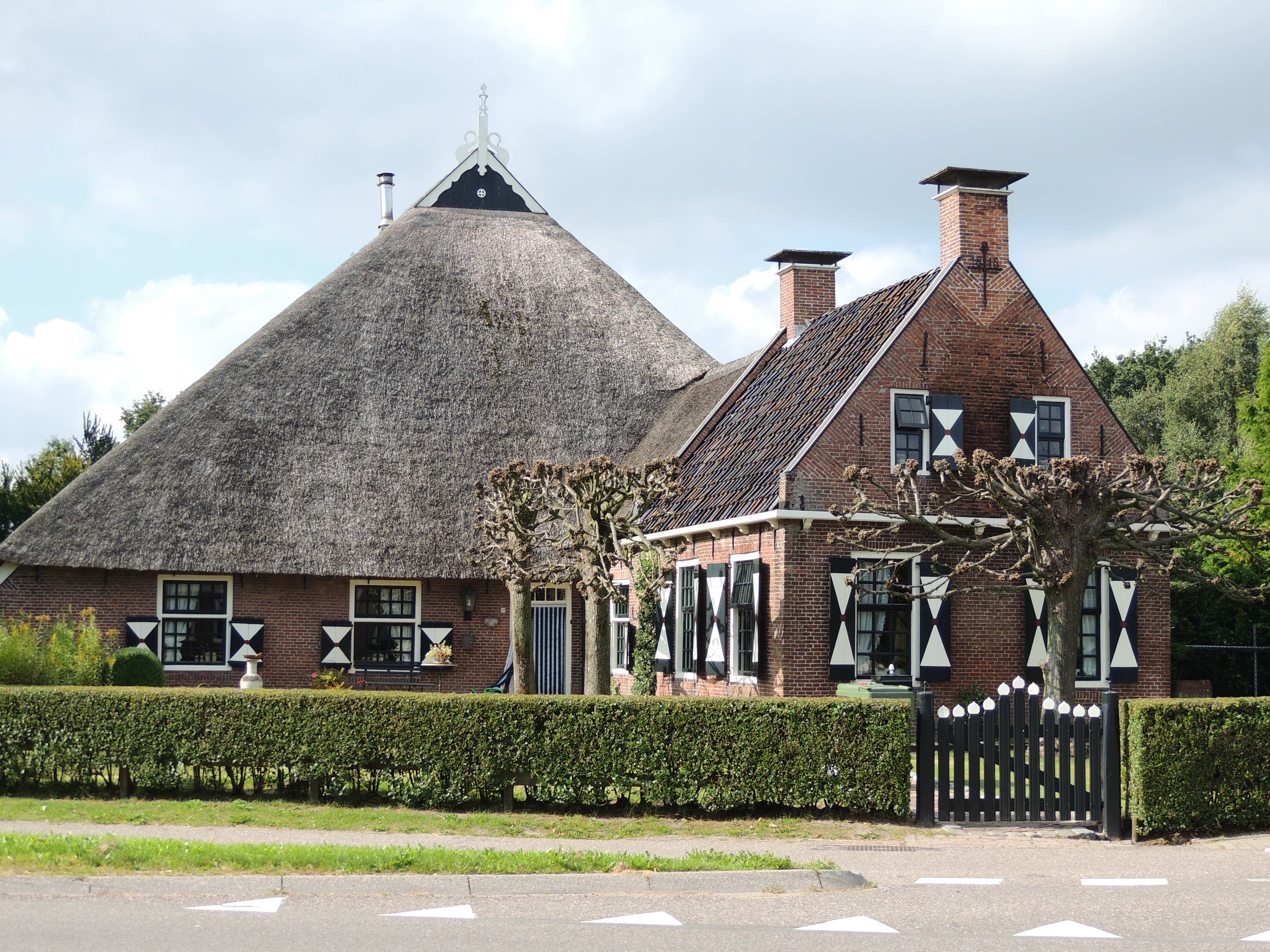
Head-neck-trunk farm, Twijzel, Netherlands
