= Wester Bildtpollen =

In 1715, the western area of the county Het Bildt was dyked in order to reclaim it from the sea. It was named the Wester Bildtpollen. From then on the area was protected from the sea by the Nieuwe Bildtdijk. On 12 March 1751 the complete area was sold. In 1754 the eastern part, the "Ooster Bildtpollen" was reclaimed by completing the dyke around it.

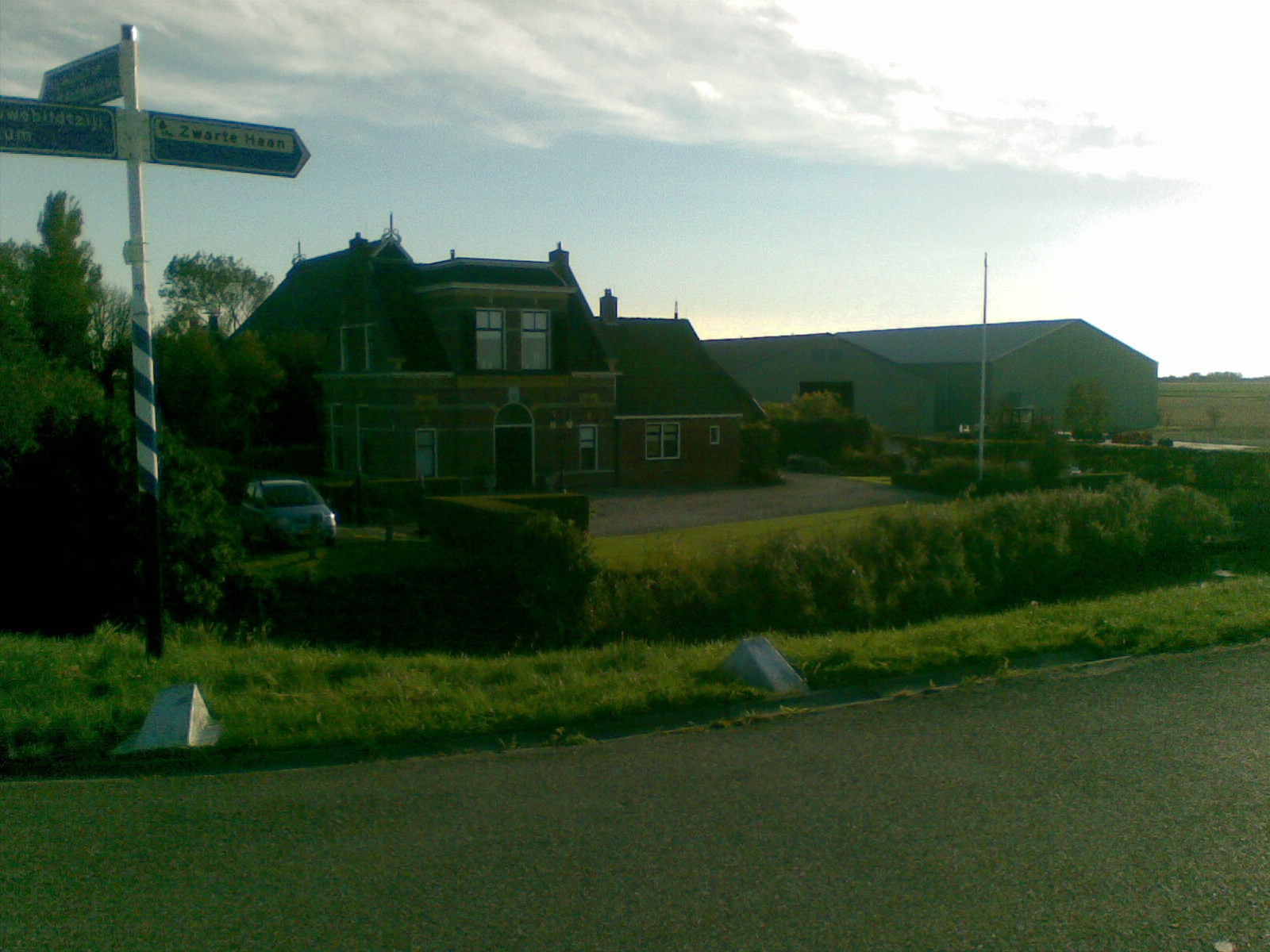
The Beachhouse of the Bildtpollen with a farmhouse behind

The characteristic "Beachhouse of the Bildtpollen" (image) from 1899 is a prominent high building which has been made for the use of the administrators. It was in use for meetings and from the "High Chamber" (Hoge Kamer) you could easily view the newlands and the Waddenzee. In the 20th century a new dike was constructed again and the beachhouse lost its function, no longer being on the coast. Nowadays it is a residential house.
