= Bildts =

Conservative Hollandic dialect

A woman speaking Bildts recorded in the Netherlands.

Bildts (pronounced [bɪlts]) is a conservative Hollandic dialect spoken in the largest part of the former municipality het Bildt in the Dutch province of Friesland. The dialect retains features from around 1505, when the area was reclaimed from the sea as ordered by George, Duke of Saxony. In order to achieve this task, workers from Holland, Zeeland, and Brabant moved to Friesland. The apparent similarity to present-day Frisian is due to the evolution of Frisian from the sixteenth century into the present.

Bildts is spoken in the towns of Sint Annaparochie (Bildts: Sint-Anne), Sint Jacobiparochie (Sint-Jabik), Vrouwenparochie (Froubuurt), Oudebildtzijl (Ouwe-Syl), Westhoek (De Westhoek) and Nij Altoenae. The inhabitants of Minnertsga, a village located outside the polder area of the former Middelzee and included in the municipality in 1984, do not speak Bildts but West Frisian instead.
