= Nieuwe Bildtdijk =

Coordinates: 53°18′31″N 5°40′55″E

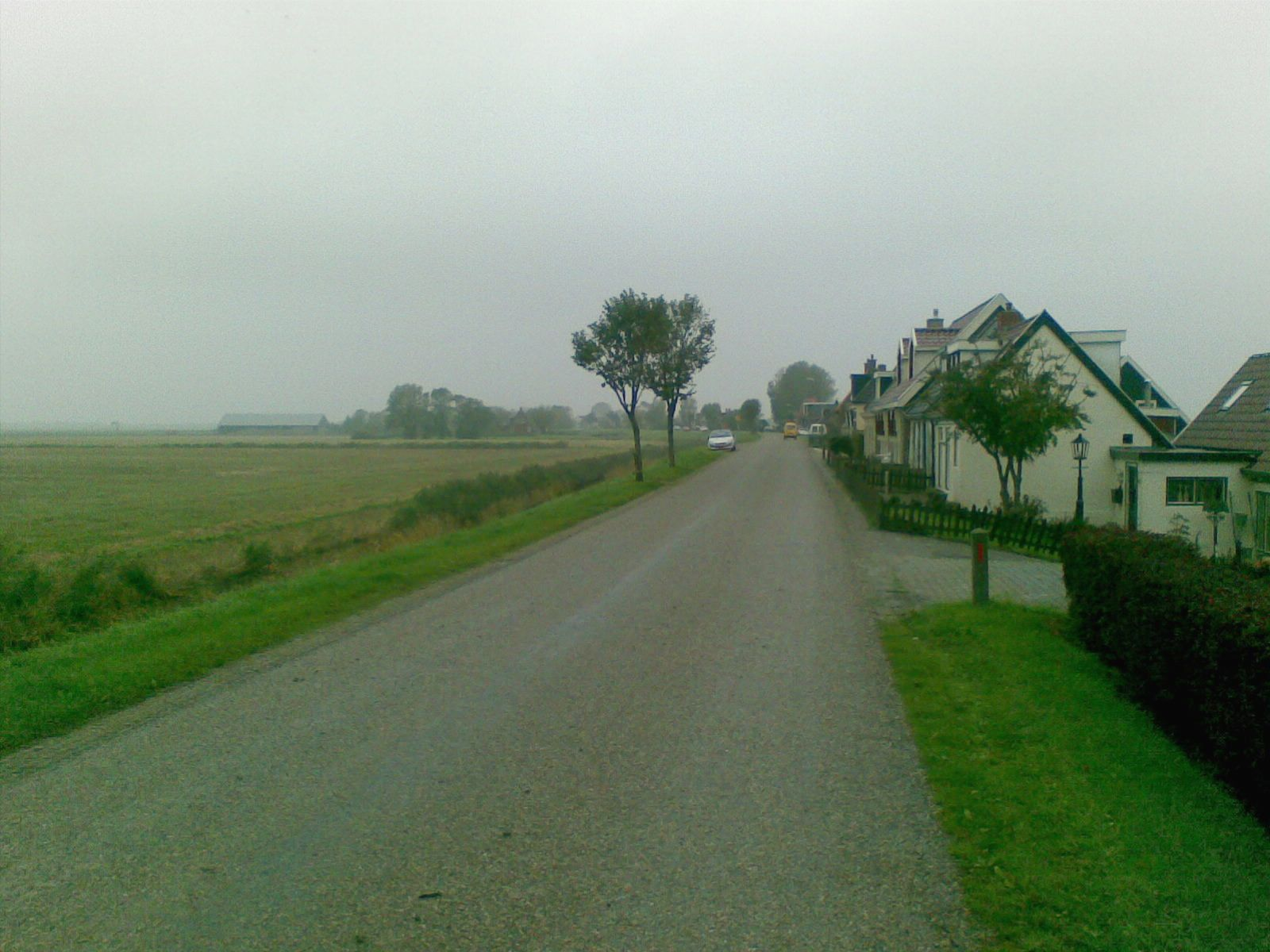
Image of the Nieuwe Bildtdijk

The Nieuwe Bildtdijk, "Nije dyk" in the local language of "Het Bildts", is a dike in the Dutch municipality Waadhoeke which was built around the year 1600 to protect the land from flooding. It protected the Wester Bildtpollen and the Ooster Bildtpollen from the Waddenzee. A new higher and stronger dike between it and the sea makes it no longer the first barrier to the sea. Nowadays a narrow road runs along the top of the dike and many houses and farmhouses are situated on this dike, mainly on the northern side. The Nieuwe Bildtdijk superseded the older more inland dike, the Oude Bildtdijk.

At the eastern end is a small village called Nieuwe Bildtzijl and at the western end is the hamlet Zwarte Haan.
