= Sint Jacobiparochie =

Sint Jacobiparochie Sint-Jabik
- Village
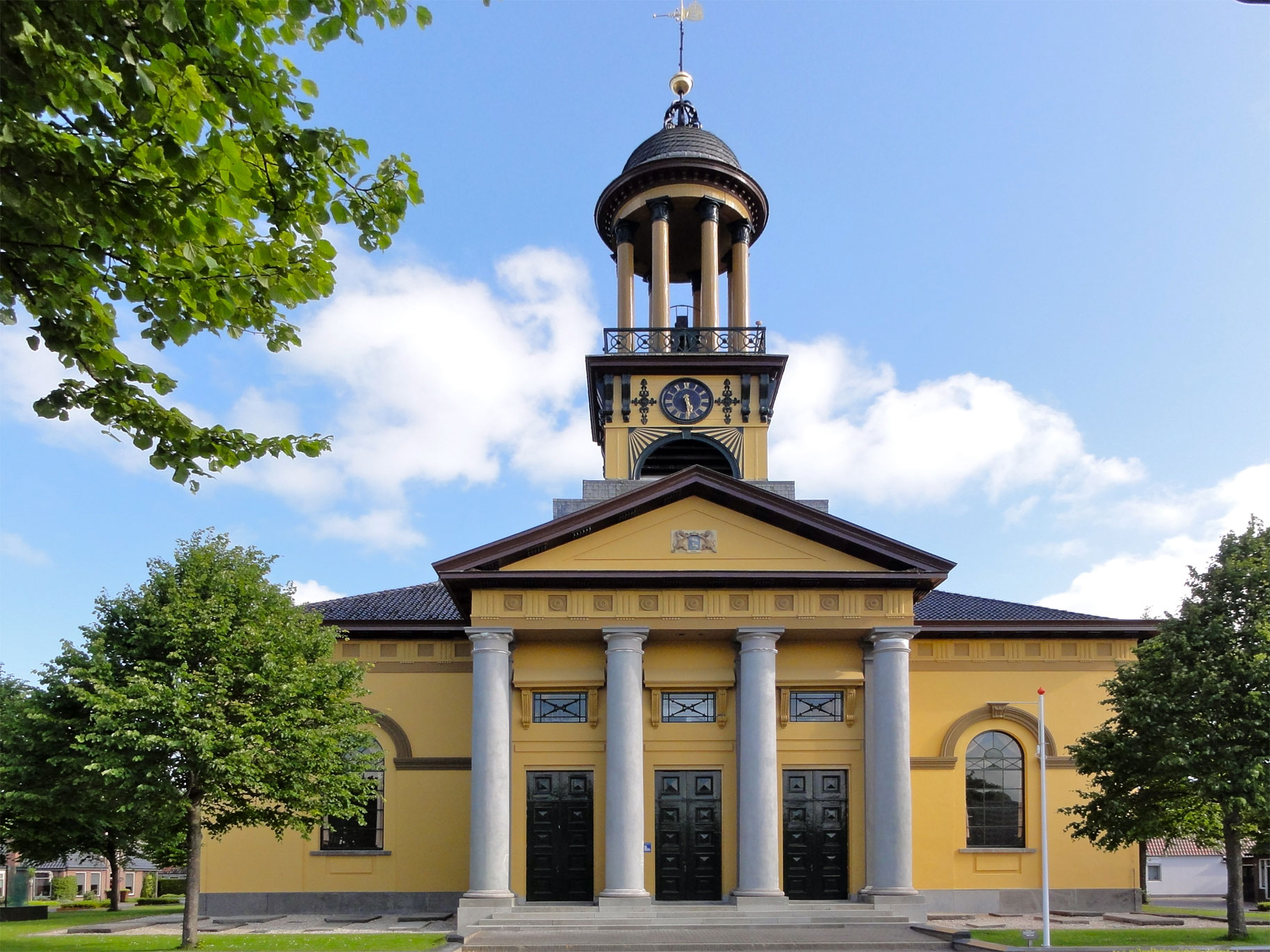
- St Jacob's church

- Flag Coat of arms

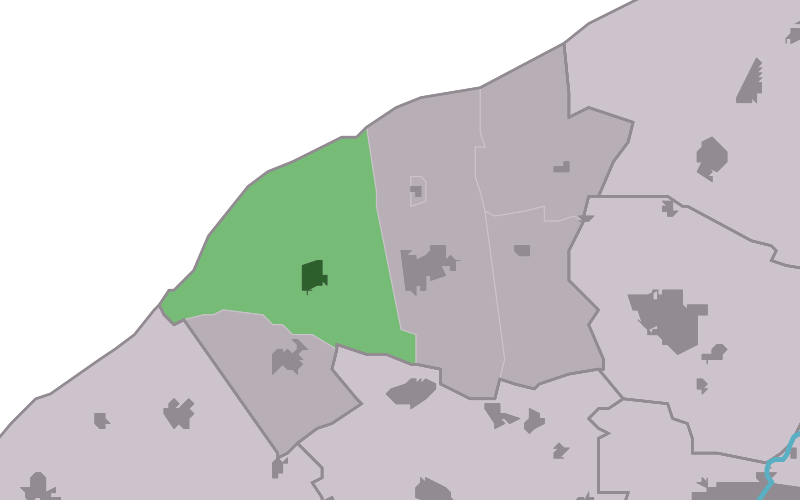
- Location in het Bildt municipality

- Location in the Netherlands Sint Jacobiparochie (Netherlands)
- Country: Netherlands
- Province: Friesland
- Municipality: Waadhoeke

Area
  - Total: 23.18 km^{2} (8.95 sq mi)
- Elevation: 0.8 m (2.6 ft)

Population (2021)
  - Total: 1,765
  - Density: 76.14/km^{2} (197.2/sq mi)
- Time zone: UTC+1 (CET)
  - Summer (DST): UTC+2 (CEST)
- Postal code: 9079
- Dialing code: 0518

Sint Jacobiparochie (Dutch: [sɪɲ tɕaːˈkoːbipaːˌrɔxi]; West Frisian and Bildts: Sint-Jabik) is a village in the municipality of Waadhoeke in Friesland, the Netherlands. It lies about 13 km north of Franeker and had approximately 1,365 inhabitants in January 2017.

== History ==
The village was first mentioned in 1570 as s. iacobus parochie, and means "parish of Saint Jacob". In 1504, a deal was struck between George, Duke of Saxony and four noblemen from Holland to polder the Middelzee. Each group of settlers had to select a patron saint. In 1505, the dike was constructed.

Sint Jacobiparochie was founded in 1505, when Het Bildt was diked in by workers from South Holland, Zeeland and Friesland, among others. It was initially called Wijngaarden, as the place was founded largely by Dutch settlers from Wijngaarden in South Holland.

Today, both Dutch and West Frisian are spoken in the town. The town was originally named Wijngaarden, while "St. Jacobiparochie" was the name used for the local Roman Catholic parish. Eventually, the name for the parish came to be used as the name for the town as well.

The Dutch Reformed church is a wide neoclassic church built in 1843 as the replacement of a 16th century church. In 1979, the abandoned church was sold and turned into a cultural centre.

Sint Jacobiparochie was home to 2,416 people in 1840. There used to be a station on the North Friesland Railway which opened in 1902 and closed to passengers in December 1940.

Until 2018, the village was part of het Bildt municipality.

== Gallery ==
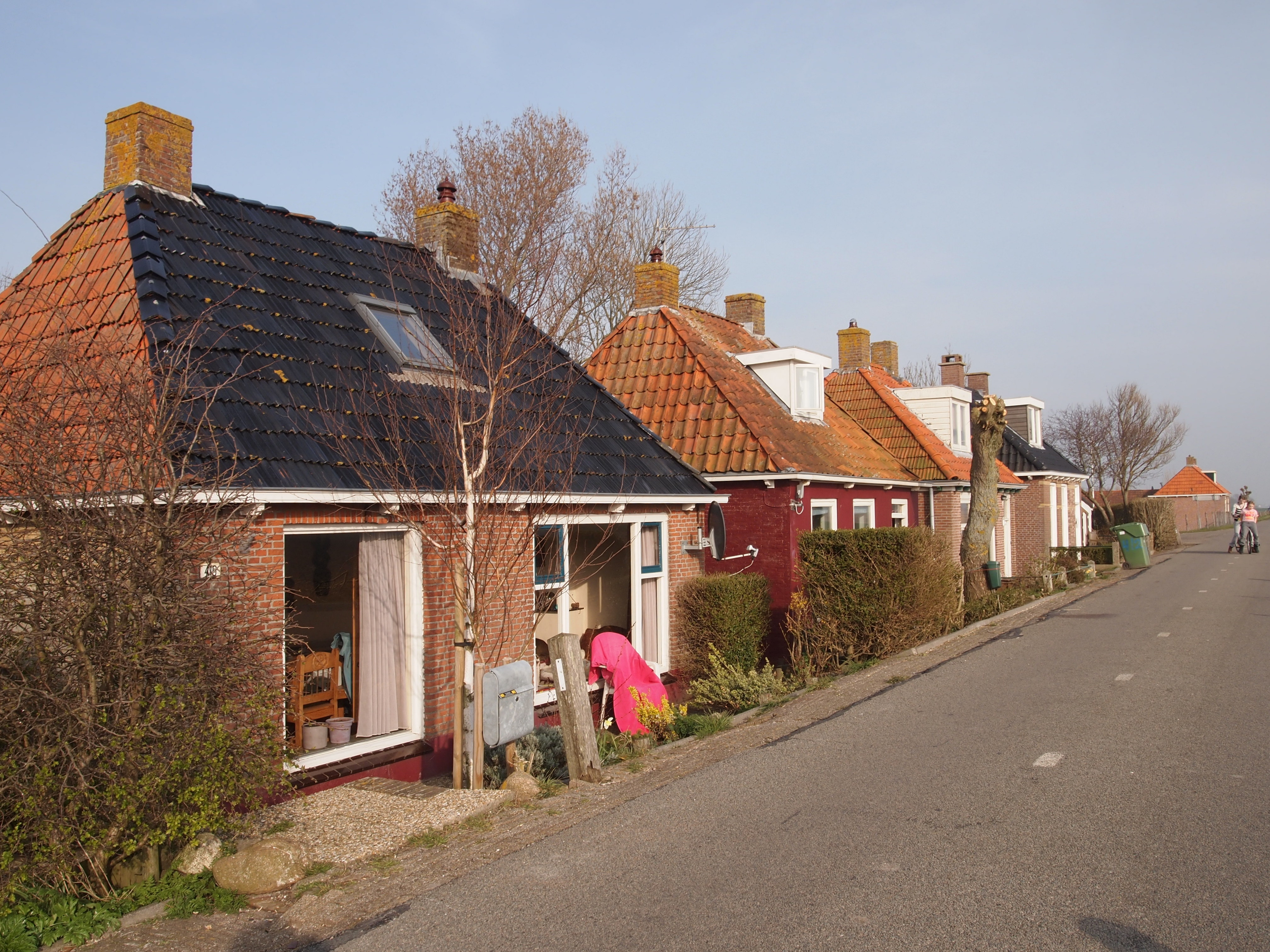
Dike houses

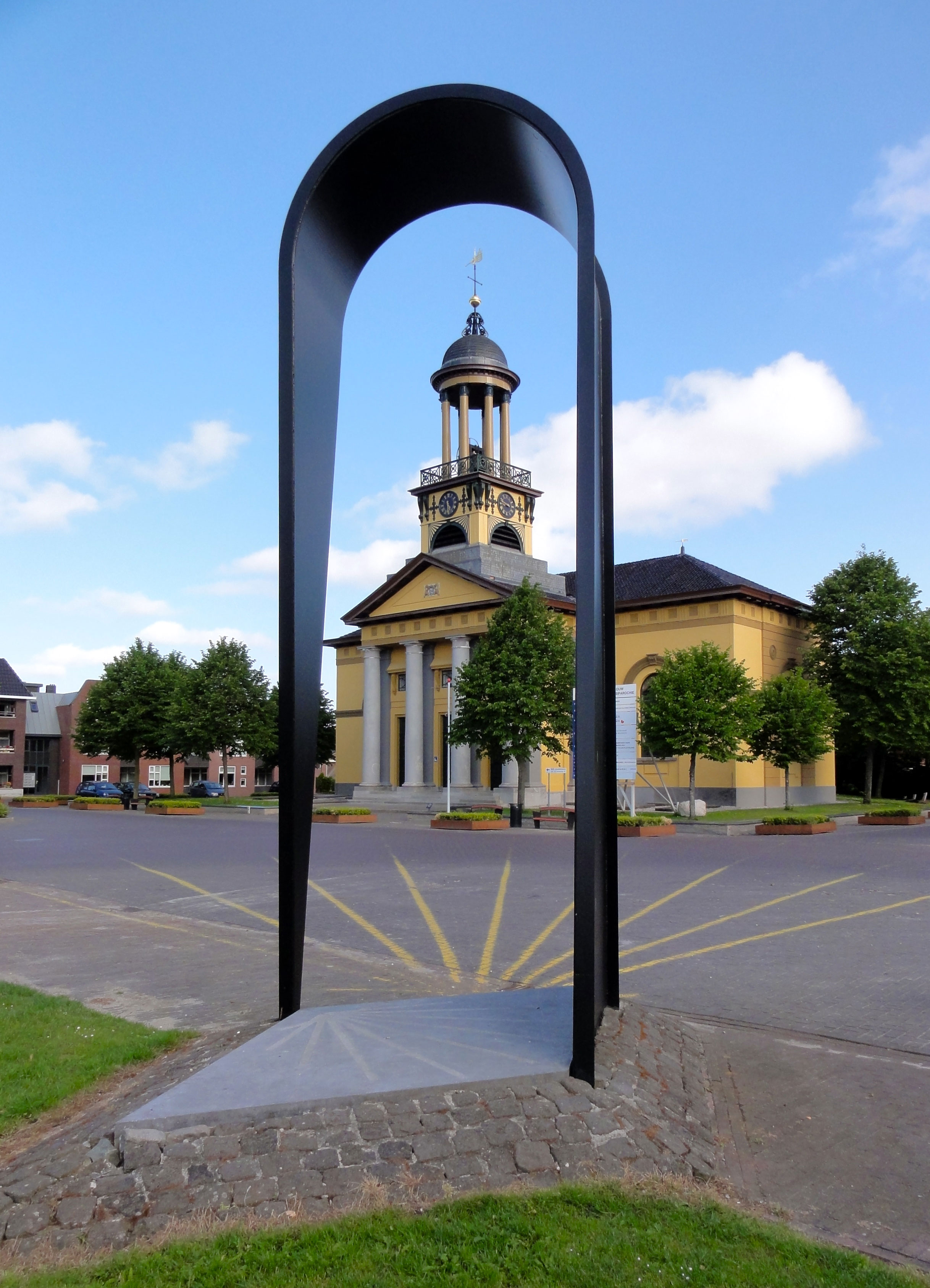
Pilgrims route marker

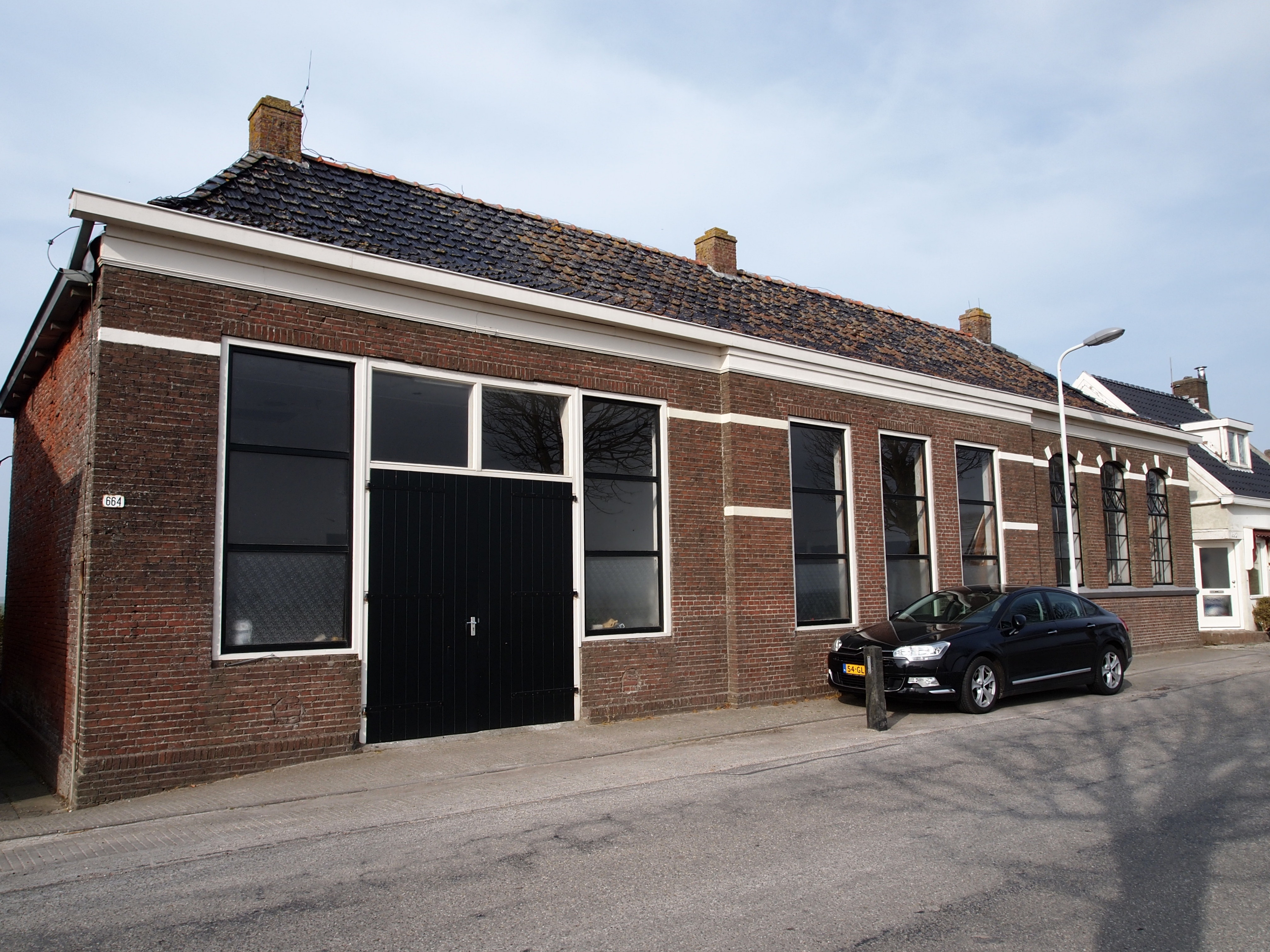
Former school building

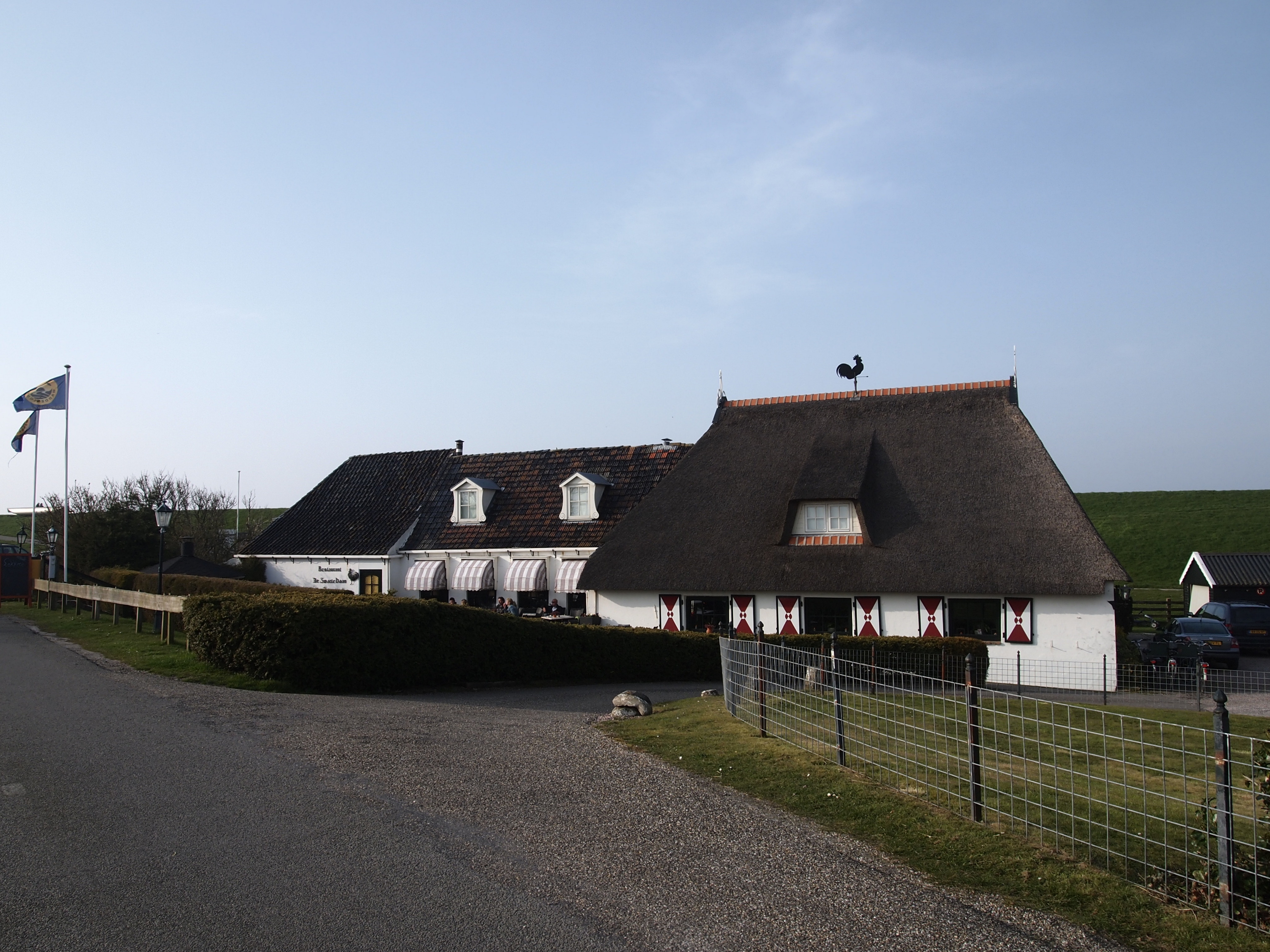
Restaurant
