= Sint Annaparochie =

Sint Annaparochie Sint-Anne (West Frisian)
- Village
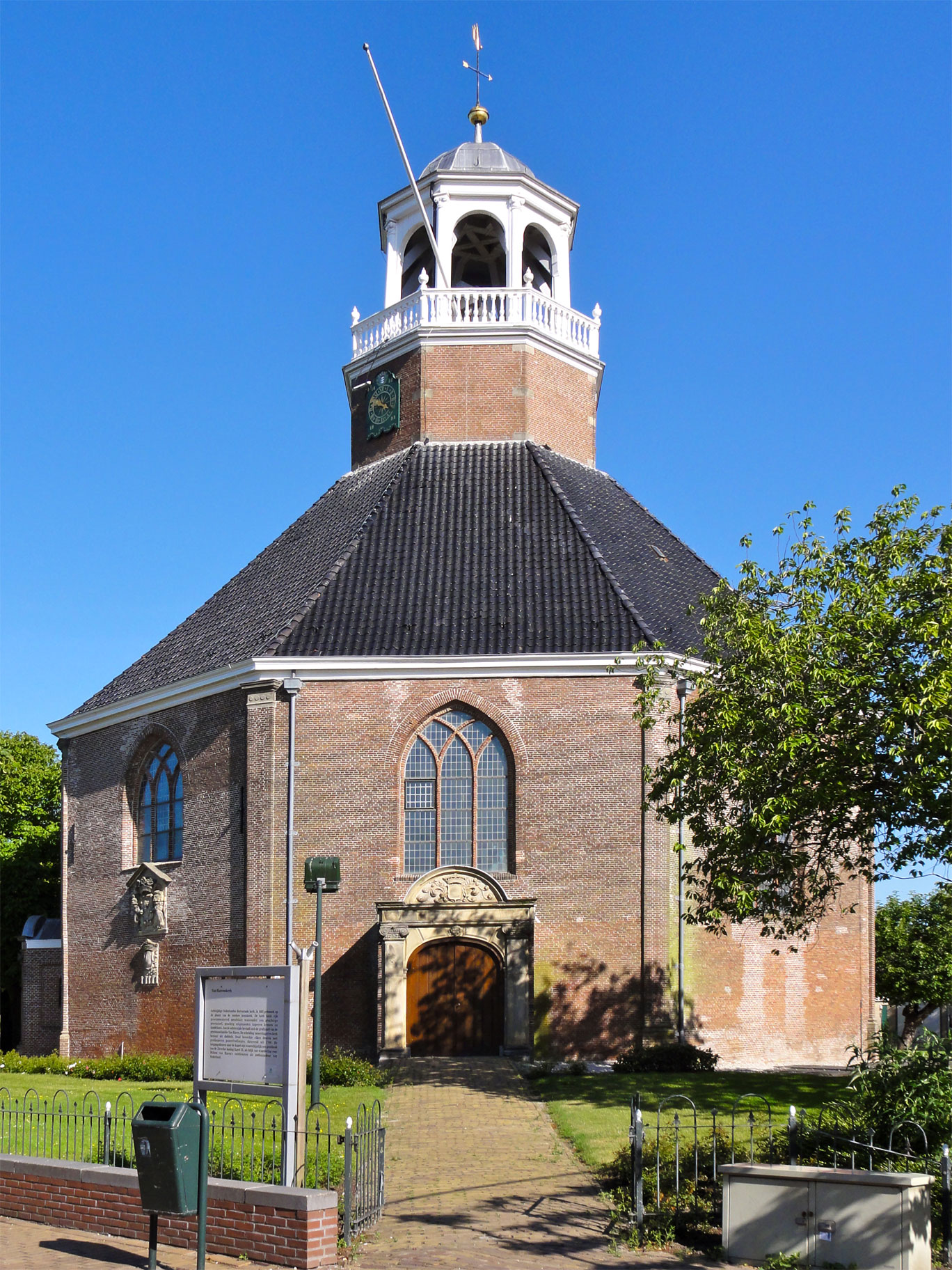
- Van Harens church

- Flag Coat of arms

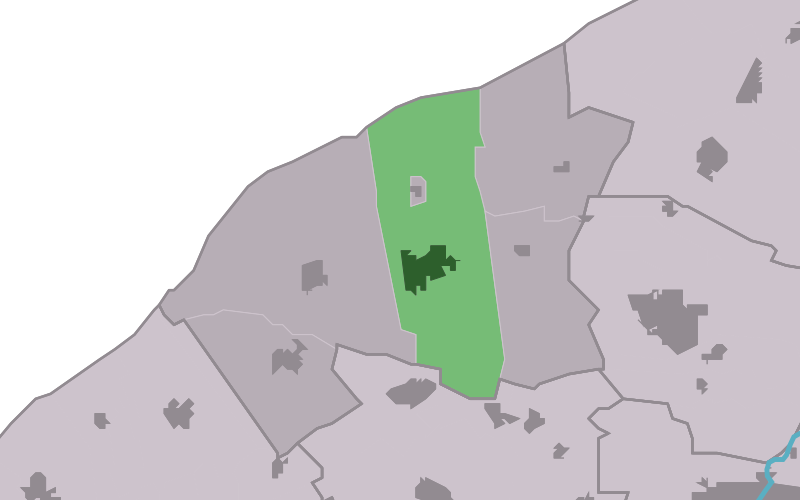
- Location in het Bildt municipality

- Location in the Netherlands Sint Annaparochie (Netherlands)
- Country: Netherlands
- Province: Friesland
- Municipality: Waadhoeke

Area
  - Total: 26.41 km^{2} (10.20 sq mi)
- Elevation: 0.9 m (3.0 ft)

Population (2021)
  - Total: 4,830
  - Density: 183/km^{2} (474/sq mi)
- Time zone: UTC+1 (CET)
  - Summer (DST): UTC+2 (CEST)
- Postal code: 9076
- Dialing code: 0518

Sint Annaparochie (Dutch: [sɪnt ˈɑnaːpaːˌrɔxi]; West Frisian and Bildts: Sint-Anne) is a village in the municipality of Waadhoeke in Friesland, Netherlands. It lies approximately 15 km (9 mi) northwest of Leeuwarden and had approximately 4,830 inhabitants in 2021. The village is named after Saint Anne, the mother of Mary.

== History ==
The village was first mentioned after 1570 as "altoenae, s. annen parochie", and means "parish of Saint Anne". It was originally called Altoenae after the estate Altena near Delft which was the neighbourhood where Dirk Oem van Wijngaarden, one of the first settlers, grew up.

In 1504, a deal was struck between George, Duke of Saxony and four noblemen from Holland to polder the Middelzee. Each group of settlers had to select a patron saint. In 1505, the dike was constructed and the village was created by the reclamation of the Bildt. The village was founded as one of the three settlements where the workers involved in the reclamation of the Bildt lived. Sint Annaparochie turned into a linear settlement at the intersection of the Middelweg with the Noordervaart. The village became the capital of the municipality of het Bildt. Though it is located in the province of Friesland, the principal language spoken in the town is Bildts or Dutch, not West Frisian.

Rembrandt was married in the parish church in St. Annaparochie in 1634. That early church was replaced in 1682 by a church was modelled after the church of Willemstad.

Sint Annaparochie was home to 2,421 people in 1840. Beach house Den Bildtpollen was built to the north of Sint Annaparochie in 1899 as residential home and conference centre in Renaissance Revival style. There used to be a station on the North Friesland Railway which opened in 1902 and closed to passengers in December 1940. Until 2018, the village was part of het Bildt municipality.

== Gallery ==
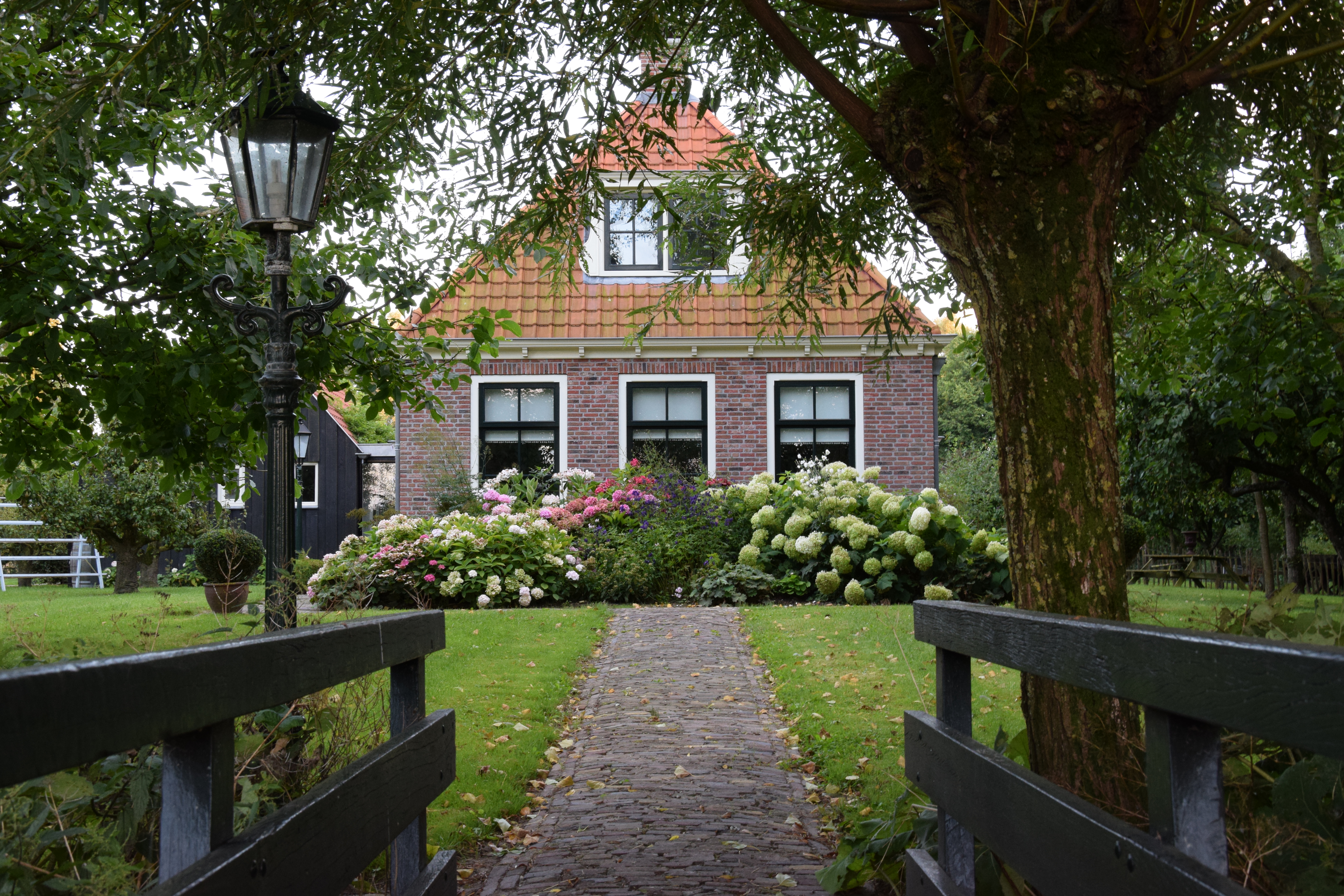
House in Sint Annaparochie

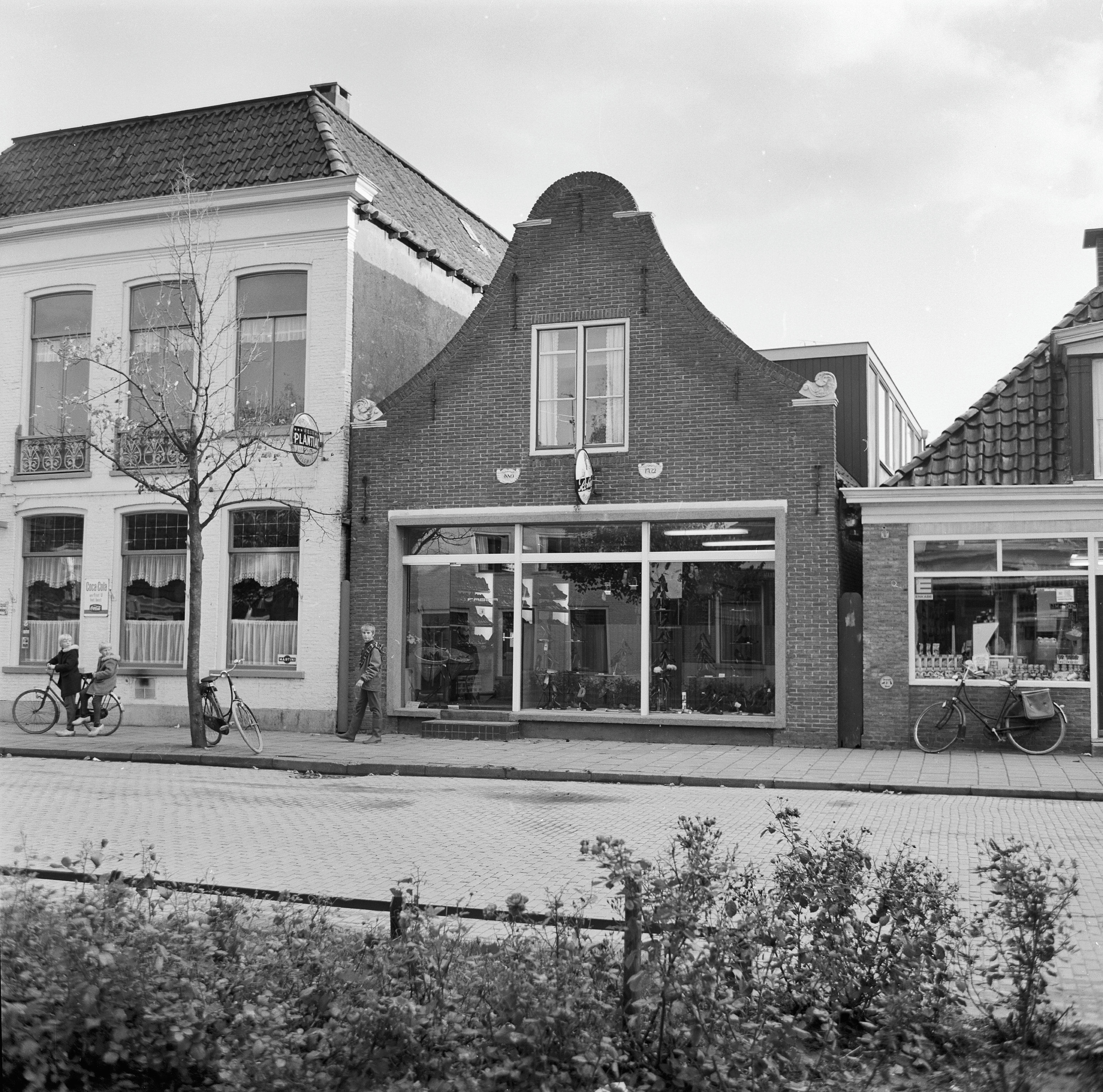
Shops in Sint Annaparochie (1968)

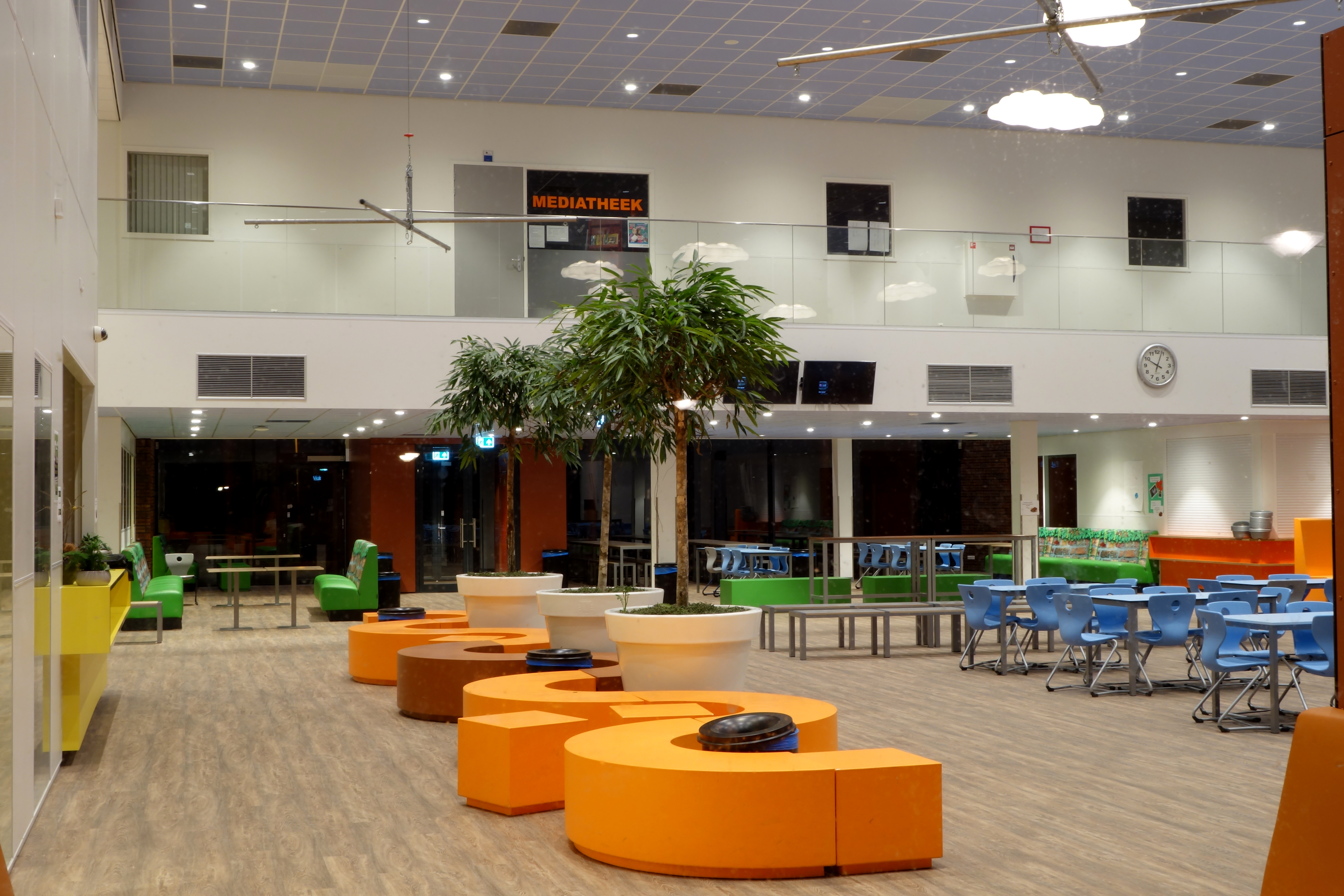
Canteen of the high school

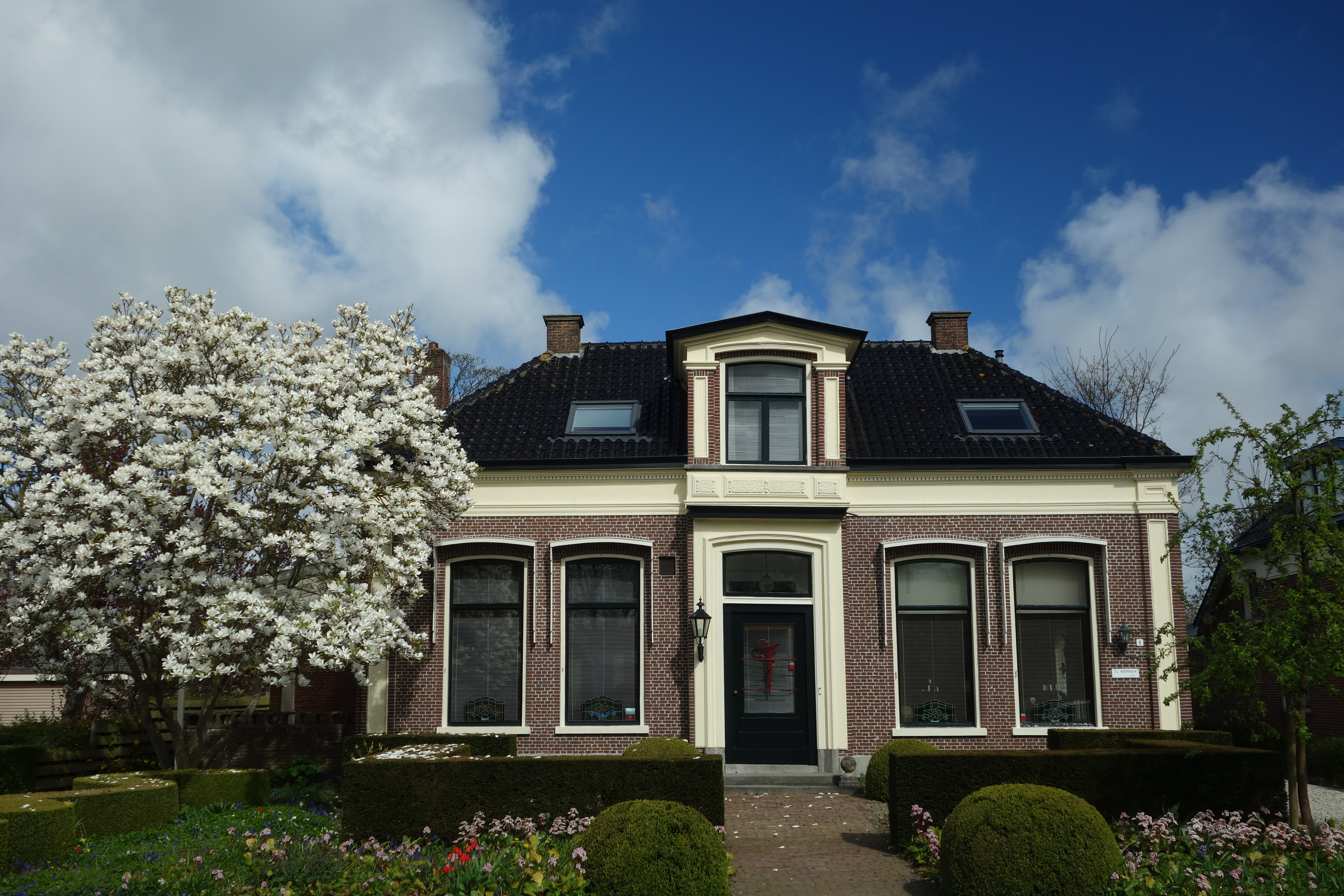
House in Sint Annaparochie
