= Oude Bildtdijk =

Coordinates: 53°17′49″N 5°40′5″E

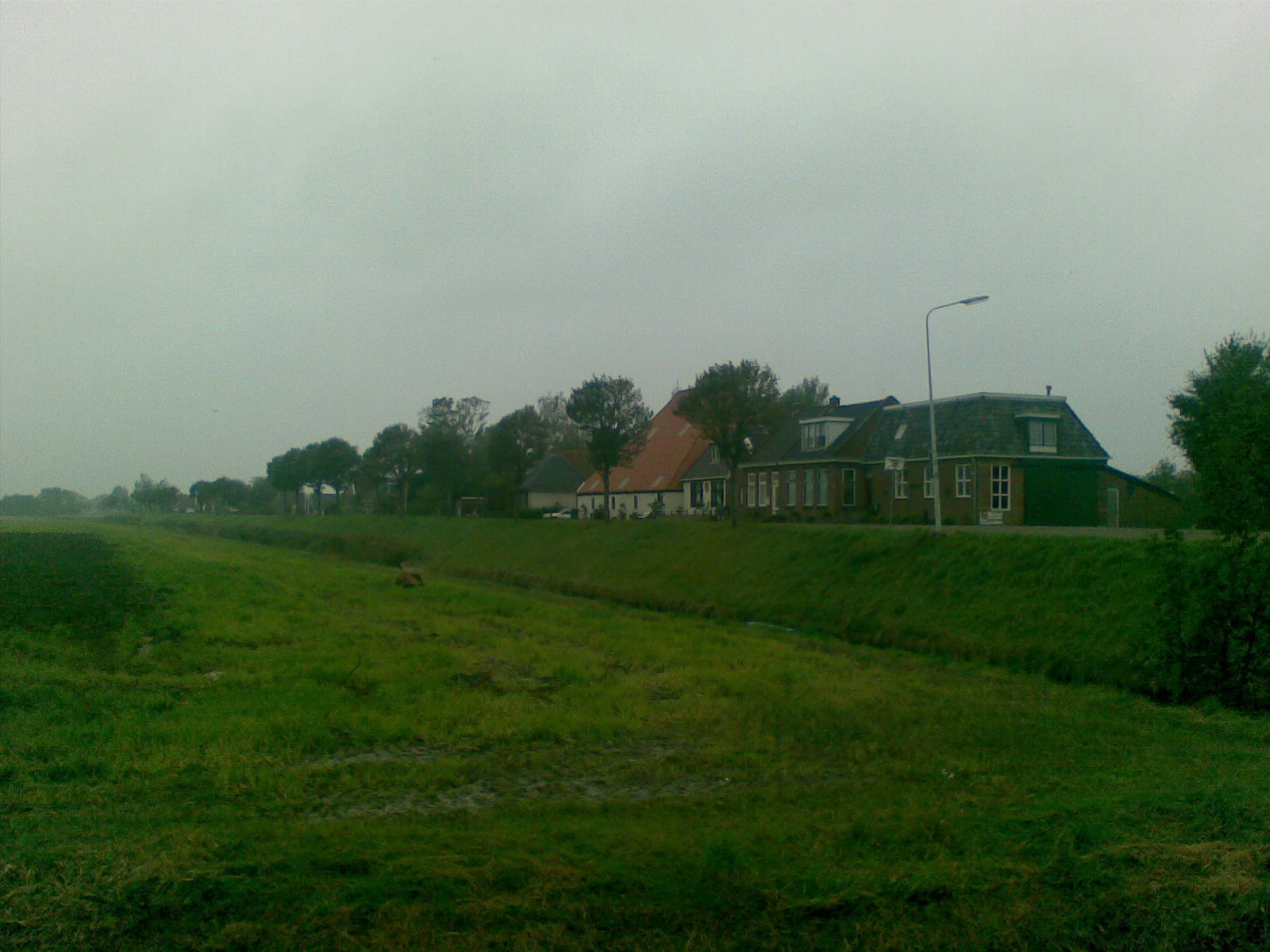
view on a western part of the Oude Bildtdijk

The Oude Bildtdijk, "Ouwe dyk" in the local dialect "Het Bildts" was the first dike in the former Dutch county Het Bildt, built in the 16th century, to protect the new lands from flooding. Het Bildt once was part of the Middelzee and even until this day land silts up and new lands are being given by the Waddenzee. This dike was the first barrier to protect the Bildt area from the sea.

The Nieuwe Bildtdijk that was built in the 17th century made the Oude Bildtijk lose its protective function. Also, the Nieuwe Bildtdijk eventually lost its function when an even higher and stronger dike was thrown up in the 20th century. Nowadays, a narrow road runs over the dike and many houses and farmhouses are situated (mainly on the northern side) along and of this dike. From the year 1546, under the rule of emperor Carl V, it was only allowed to build houses on the northern side of the dikes. Only with approval of the emperor was it allowed to build on the south side. Not more than two houses have been built on the south side, of which only one still exists this day, number 237. This rule was to protect the precious land from housing, so it would be used for farming only.

With a distance of 14 kilometers, the Oude Bildtdijk is the longest street of Friesland.
