= Calf hutch =

Enclosure for dairy calves

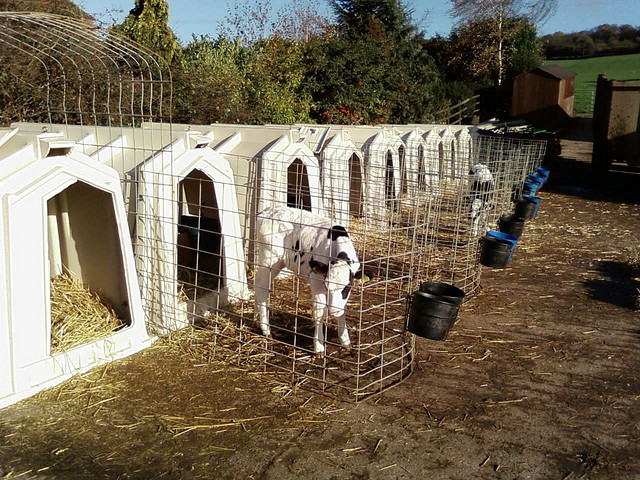
Calf hutch on a farm in England

A calf hutch is an enclosure used in the dairy industry to keep pre-weaned calves separated individually and outside year-round. They are typically made of plastic and have an opening to a small fenced-in area or tether calves to it. They are commonly used around the world. They have faced criticism from some researchers for negatively impacting calves and from various animal rights and animal welfare groups who call it cruel and call to end their use.

== History ==
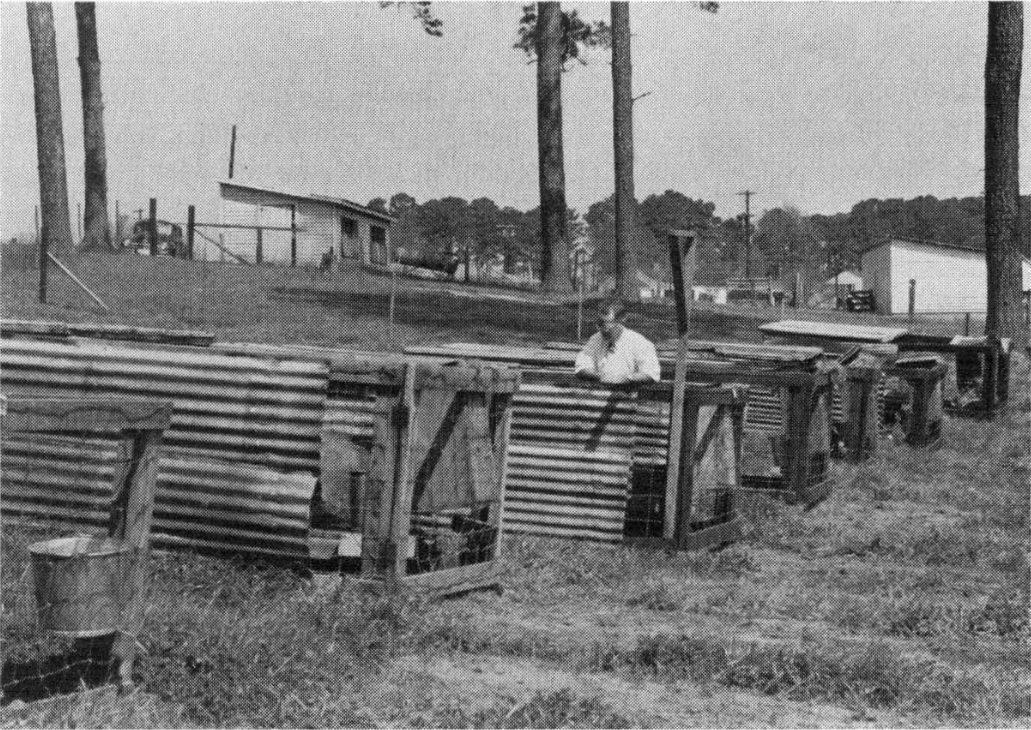
Early research on individual pens in the 1950s

In 1943, the predecessor of a calf hutch (a portable pen) was invented in the US for the stated purpose of trying to limit disease spread. In 1947, it was modified to add a roof, making it into a calf hutch itself. They became popular in North America in the 1970s. In 1977, they were introduced into Japan.

== Effects on calves ==
Calf hutches are known to limit calves' abilities for social and play behavior. Compared to pair housing, calves raised in hutches or other individual housing show worse social and cognitive abilities along with more vocalizations in stressful settings.

Studies are mixed on whether calf hutches offer lower disease risk compared to group housing. Some researchers have also argued that the cleaning and ventilation of housing is a more important factor for disease than the way the calves are housed.

== Criticism ==
Various animal rights and animal welfare groups have criticized the use of calf hutches. Animal Justice has called for it to be banned in Canada. Animal Equality has called them a form of "extreme confinement". World Animal Protection has called them a source of significant stress for calves.

In 2017, the RSPCA defended their use on disease reduction grounds but suggested minimizing their use because of social harms to calves. They also acknowledged newer research suggesting that small group housing does not pose disease risks and suggested it may influence their position in the future.

== Global presence ==
Usage of calf hutches varies around the world but is common in many countries. Some countries with low usage of calf hutches still use high rates of individual housing through other methods.

In the UK, 38% of dairy farms used some form of individual housing with 16% using calf hutches specifically as of 2022. In Ireland, 41% of dairy farms used some form of individual housing as of 2023. A 2021 survey in China found 56% of large farms and 33% of medium-sized farms used individual separation, but around 3/4ths of calves were housed indoors. In Canada, 63% of pre-weaned calves were in individual housing with 21% in hutches as of 2018. As of 2014, Southern Brazil saw 70% housed individually, but primarily indoors, so only 7% of total housing were calf hutches. In the US, 80% of dairy farms used individual housing, 42.1% of which were calf hutches or outdoor pens as of 2011.

Some countries place a degree of limitation on their use. The EU allows use for calves under 8 weeks old but not over. They also require direct visual and tactile contact between calves, but it is common for this to be ignored. The UK places those requirements and also requires hutches to be large enough for calves to stand up and turn around.

== See also ==
- Veal crates, a similar enclosure used in the veal industry
- Tie stall
- Cow-calf separation
