= Tie stall =

Type of stall where animals are tethered at the neck

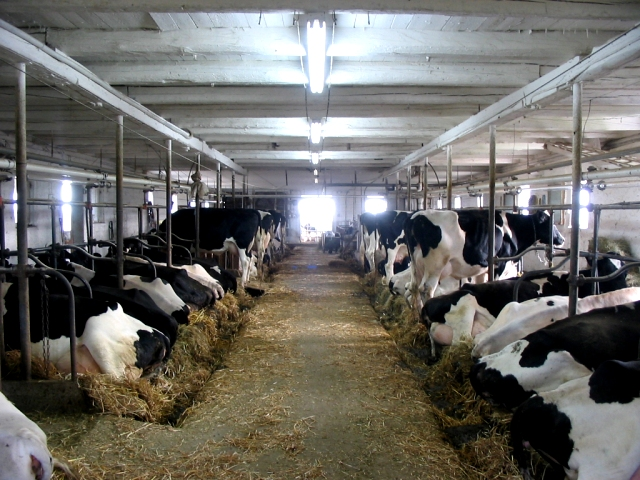
Cows in a tie stall

Tie stalls, also known as stanchion or stall byre (UK) or barn (US), are a type of stall where animals are tethered at the neck to their stall. It is mostly used in the dairy industry, although horses might also be stalled in tie stalls (often referred to as stands or straight stalls). Typically, the byre or dairy barn has one or two rows of stalls, where the cow is tied up for resting, feeding, milking and watering. This type of housing is used in both regular and organic farming, but is becoming obsolete due to animal welfare regulations.

== History ==
The actual tie stall, in which the animals stand on a slightly raised platform behind a manure gutter, must be distinguished from the deep litter stall, where the animals stood tethered on the accumulated manure or were able to move freely upon it. Free deep‑litter stalls were particularly suitable for sheep and young cattle. For dairy farming, however, they were less desirable on account of the required hygiene and the demands of the milking process. Horse stables were generally tie stalls, due to the sensitivity of horses' hooves to thrush and other ailments.

The success of the modern tie stall was closely linked to the decline of deep litter byres and barns. The latter were commonly used on poor soils in mainland Europe until the late 19th century. The mixture of bedding material (usually straw) and manure proved to be perfect fertilizer. However, the introduction of artificial fertilizer meant farmers no longer needed to use animal manure as fertilizer.

Due to growing international competition, dairy producers began to focus more on hygiene from 1870 onwards. Cows in deep litter dairy barns were often dirty, which meant they also had dirty udders, resulting in contamination of the milk. Standing in manure also resulted in lameness and other hoof problems. Hence, farmers started to build the more hygienic tie stalls.

After World War II farmers started to replace tie stalls with the free stall barn.

== Types ==
In the Netherlands two main types of tie stalls were distinguished, which spread – together with modern dairy farming ― to other parts of the world. Analogous systems were in use in other countries.

- Frisian tie stall (originally in the Old Frisian longhouse and related farm types): The two rows of stalls are located in such a way that the animals face the wall. As a rule, the cows stand in pairs, separated by a post and a divider. The manure gutter and walkway are located behind the animals, between the stall rows. Feeding and watering the cows used to be time‑consuming, because the caretaker had to move between the animals. In the aisled Frisian barn and related farmtypes there were usually a single row of cows, accommodated in a side aisle of the building. In modern 20th-century barns, a feeding alley became located between the animals and the wall.
- Dutch tie stall (originally from South Holland and neighbouring districts): The two rows of stalls are located in such a way that the animals face each other. In between the stall rows is the feeding alley. The manure gutter is located behind the animals along the outer wall, separated from it by a walkway.

== The byre ==
20th-century tie stall, mainly based on the Frisian system, are quite different from earlier types. Most of the byres or dairy barns used to have low ceilings stagnating the airflow. This was especially troublesome in the summer, when cows are likely to suffer from heat stress. Nowadays, ventilators are used in tie stalls with low ceilings. Watering the animals is greatly facilitated by the installation of water supply systems, which came into use in the first half of the 20th century. In the US, tunnel ventilation might be applied, in which one wall contains (lots of) exhaust fans and there is an open wall on the opposite end. A sprinkler system, often used as prevention of heat stress in free stalls, isn't used in tie stall as the bedding might get too moist.

As cows spend most of their day ruminating, it is important they have enough space to stand up and lie down. Older byres or dairy barns didn't have a divider between the stalls, which meant a cow could put her legs in the neighboring stall preventing the neighboring cow from lying down. Nowadays, the usage of stall dividers is common place, and in some countries it's even mandatory.

The stall dimensions depend on the cow size, with pregnant and sick cows needing more space. In the Netherland dimensions of 1,85 meter by 1,25 meter are used. In the USA, 52 inch (1,3208 meter) is most common. The front of the stall should be open, so that the cow can lunge forward when standing up.

Different materials can be used for the bedding. In the 20th century, the bedding consisted of concrete, now waterbeds and mattresses are more common. However, as these surfaces are not comfortable enough on their own, usually a layer of sand, sawdust, or straw is added.

Chain length is of crucial importance. When too long, a chain might allow the cow to lie too far backwards in the manure gutter. In addition, the cow might get her legs stuck in the chain. A chain that is too short prevents the cow from lying down.

== Usage across the world ==
=== North-America ===
In 2014, 39% of American dairy farms used tie stalls for lactating cows. Similarly, 73% of Canadian dairy farms used tie stalls in 2021.

=== Netherlands ===
Until 1970, when the free stalls with cubicles were introduced, almost all farms used tie stalls (called 'grupstal'). It was common practice to keep cows indoors from autumn to spring, and outdoors to graze during the summer. In 2017, Stichting Kwaliteitszorg Onderhoud Melkinstallaties (KOM) indicated that approximately 6.5% of the farms still used tie stalls. The usage of tie stalls hasn't been allowed for organic farming since 2016. However, dairy processors no longer accept new suppliers using tie stalls.

=== Germany ===
According an estimation in 2010, approximately 27% of the cows are kept in tie stalls especially on smaller farms (< 20 cows). Differences between areas are large. In 2017, 30% of the dairy farms in Baden-Württemberg used tie stalls, while 60% of the farm in Bavaria did so. Note, it is quite common to keep the cows inside all year round.

=== Alps (Austria and Switzerland) ===
In the alpine area it is very common to keep animals indoor in tie stalls from autumn to spring and move them to mountain pastures in the summer. However, in Switzerland it is required to give the cows outdoor exercise for at least 4 hours a day.

After decades of discussion, it was decided in Austria in July 2022 that the ban on all-year tethering is to be implemented without exception from 2030.

=== Scandinavia (Norway, Sweden and Denmark) ===
In Norway, 88% of the cows were estimated to be kept in a tie stall in 2005. However, in 2004 a new law was introduced prohibiting cows to be kept in tie stalls from 2034 onwards.

In Denmark, the construction of new tie stalls has been prohibited since January 2022, and the government has set a timeline to completely ban the tethering of cattle by 2027.

== Animal welfare ==
The restriction of movement is a general animal welfare concern. Hence, animal welfare organizations are generally against the usage of tie stalls. In addition to the restriction of movement, the inability to socialize with other cows is a concern.

Tie stall advocates argue, however, that tie stalls limit competition for feeding and drinking. It is also impossible to have an overcrowded dairy barn, which occurs in free stall barns when there are more cows than resting places.

== See also ==
- Calf hutch
