= Animal stall =

Enclosure housing one or a few animals

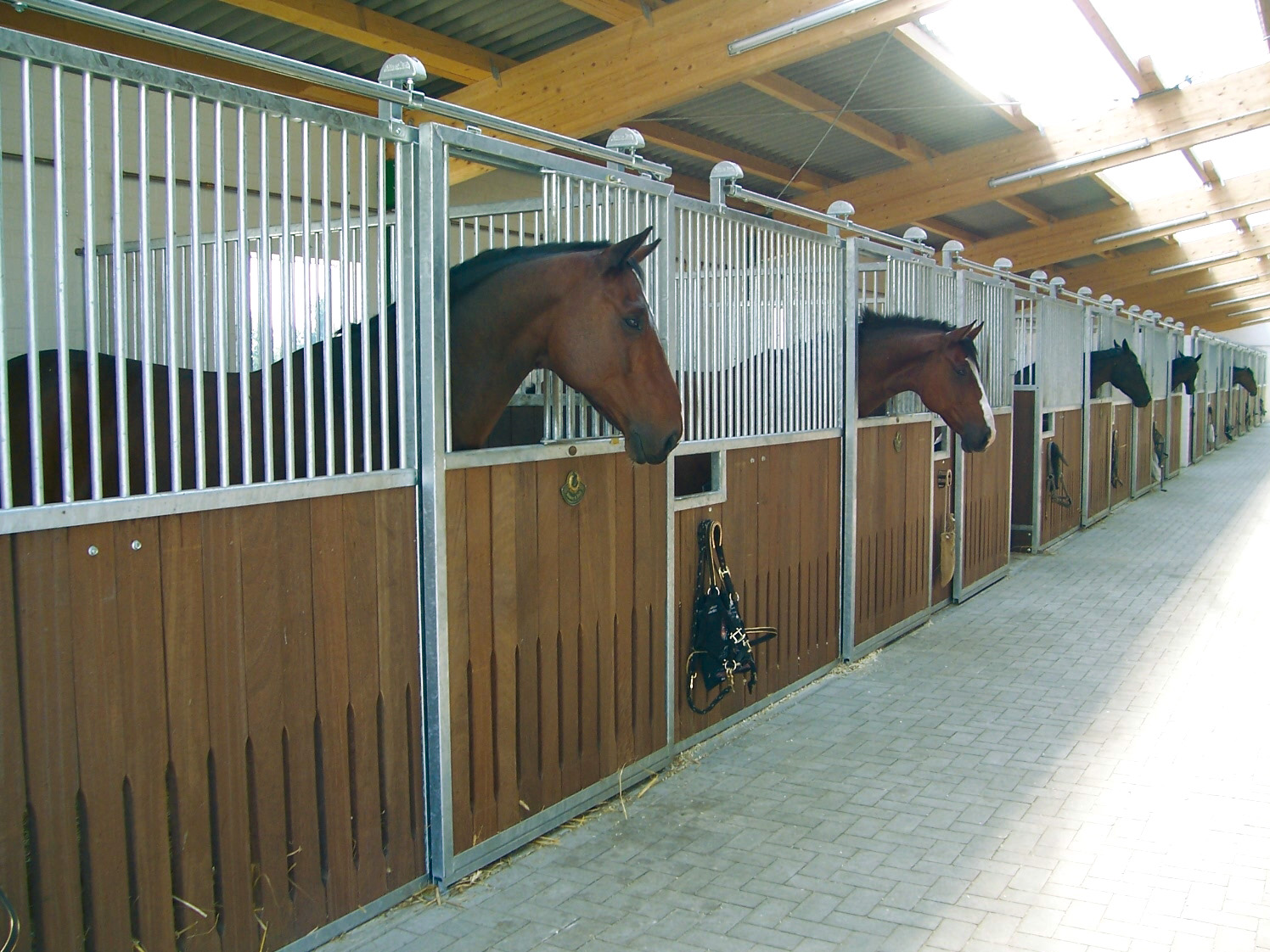
Stalls constructed inside a building

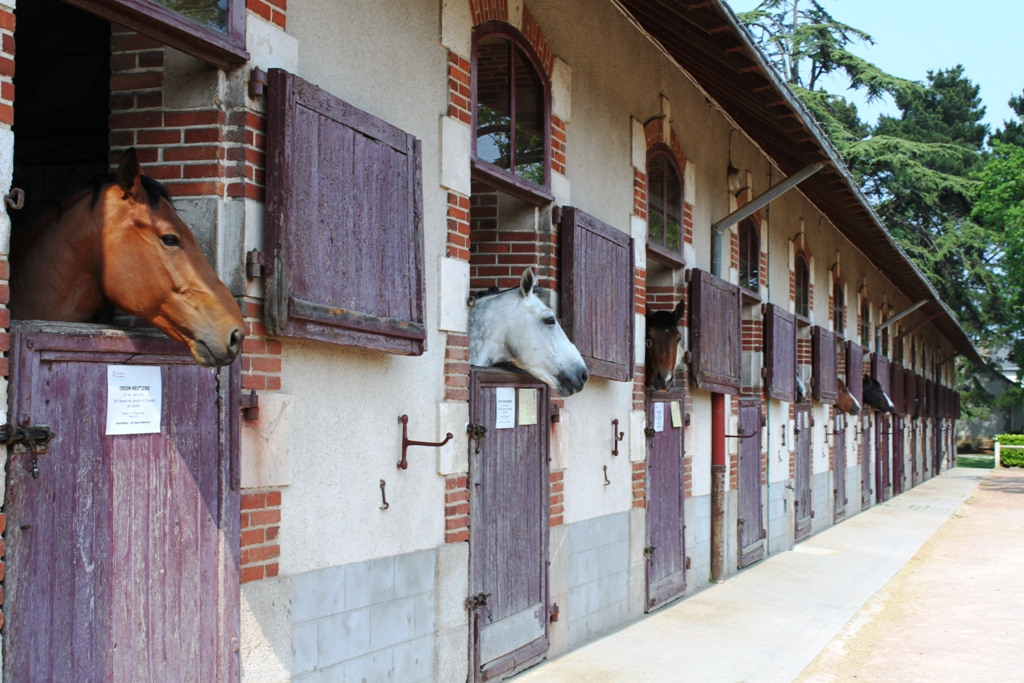
Stalls facing outward

A stall is an enclosure housing one or a few animals. A building with multiple stalls for horses is called a stable. A stable or barn which houses livestock is subdivided into stalls or pens. Freestanding stalls may be constructed inside a larger building, or be built into the structure, sometimes with the animals facing outward.

== Types ==
=== Tie stall ===
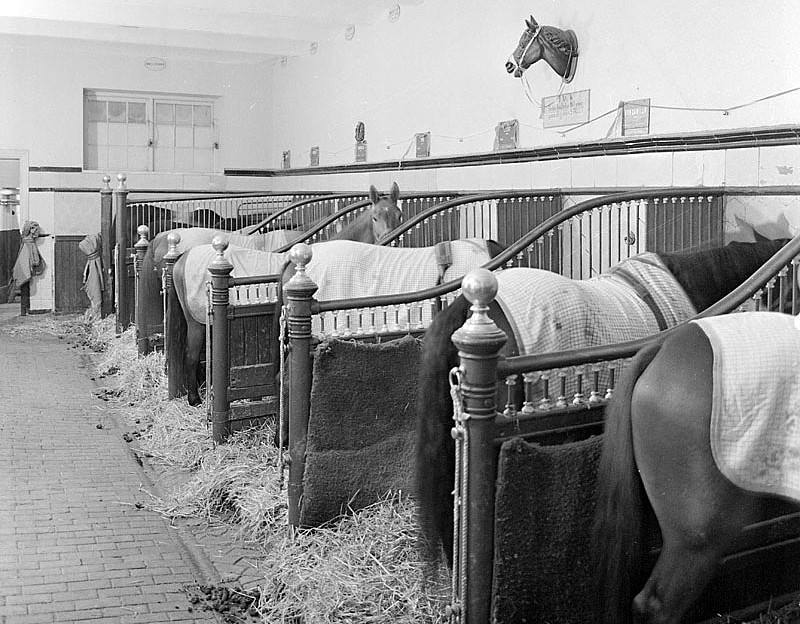
Tie stalls at a Swedish stud farm (1961)

Tie stalls (sometimes called stands or straight stalls) are a type of stall where animals are tethered at the head or neck to the feeding end of a stall, and the rear wall is omitted for easy manure removal. Tie stalls are mostly used in the dairy cow industry. When horses were primary transportation, they were commonly housed in tie stalls, and some are still housed this way.

Prior to the late 20th century, the tie stall or standing stall was a more common housing for working horses that were taken out daily. Taking only half the size of a box stall, more horses could be housed in a single stable. Generally about 5 by 10 feet (1.5 by 3.0 m) or sometimes smaller, with a manger in the front, usually to which the animal was tied, the design allowed the horse to lie down if the lead rope was long enough, but not to turn around.

=== Box stall ===
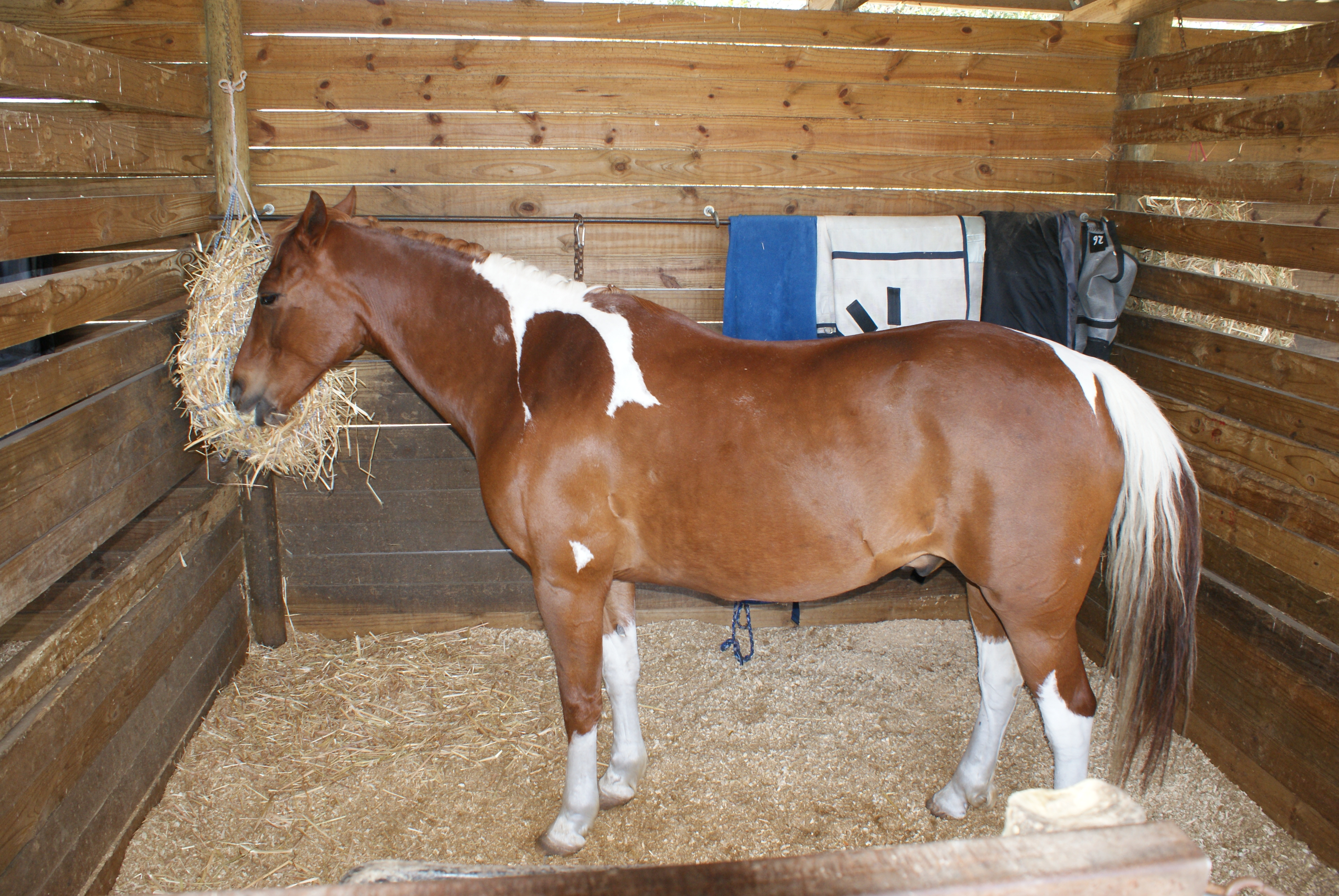
A box stall for a horse

A box stall (US) or loose box (UK) or horse box (UK) is a larger stall where a horse is not tied and is free to move about, turn around, and lay down. Sizes for box stalls vary depending on the size of the horse and a few other factors.

Typical dimensions for a single horse are 10 by 12 feet (3.0 by 3.7 m) to 14 by 14 feet (4.3 by 4.3 m). Mares with foals often are kept in double stalls. Stallions, kept alone with less access to turnout, (Note: "Turnout" means taking a horse from its stall and releasing it in a larger area where it can self-exercise.) are also often given larger quarters. Ponies sometimes are kept in smaller stalls, perhaps as small as 8 by 8 feet (2.4 m × 2.4 m). Draft horses may need larger stalls.

== Care ==
Stalls usually contain a layer of absorbent bedding such as straw or wood shavings and need to be cleaned daily. Depending on the environmental conditions and the needs of the horses, stalls may be cleaned multiple times a day - especially during winter seasons when turnout is limited, for show horses that receive meticulous grooming, or for horses recovering from injuries. Keeping stalls, paddocks, and pastures clean is one of the most important things to manage when considering the overall cleanliness and health (especially respiratory health) of horses.

== See also ==
- Stable
- Sty
