= Old Frisian longhouse =

Type of house found in Friesland

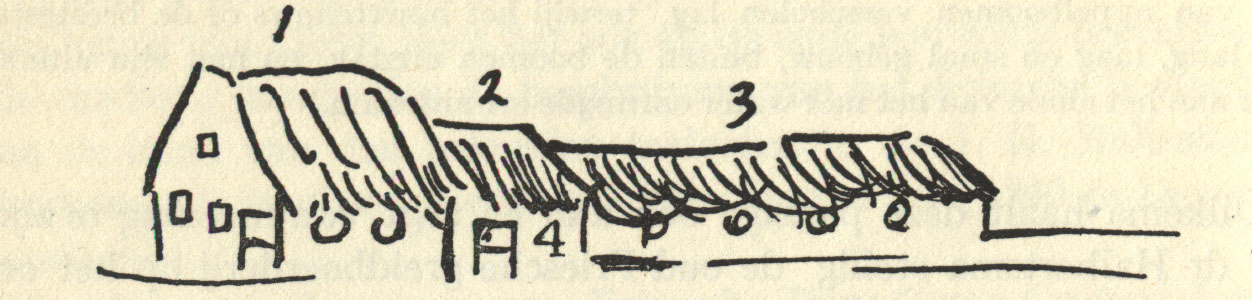
Drawing of a longhouse by Joost Hiddes Halbertsma, c. 1850. (1) dwelling quarters or "interior house" (binhús), (2) kitchen and dairy room, or "middle house" (milhús), and (3) byre or "cow house" (bûthús).

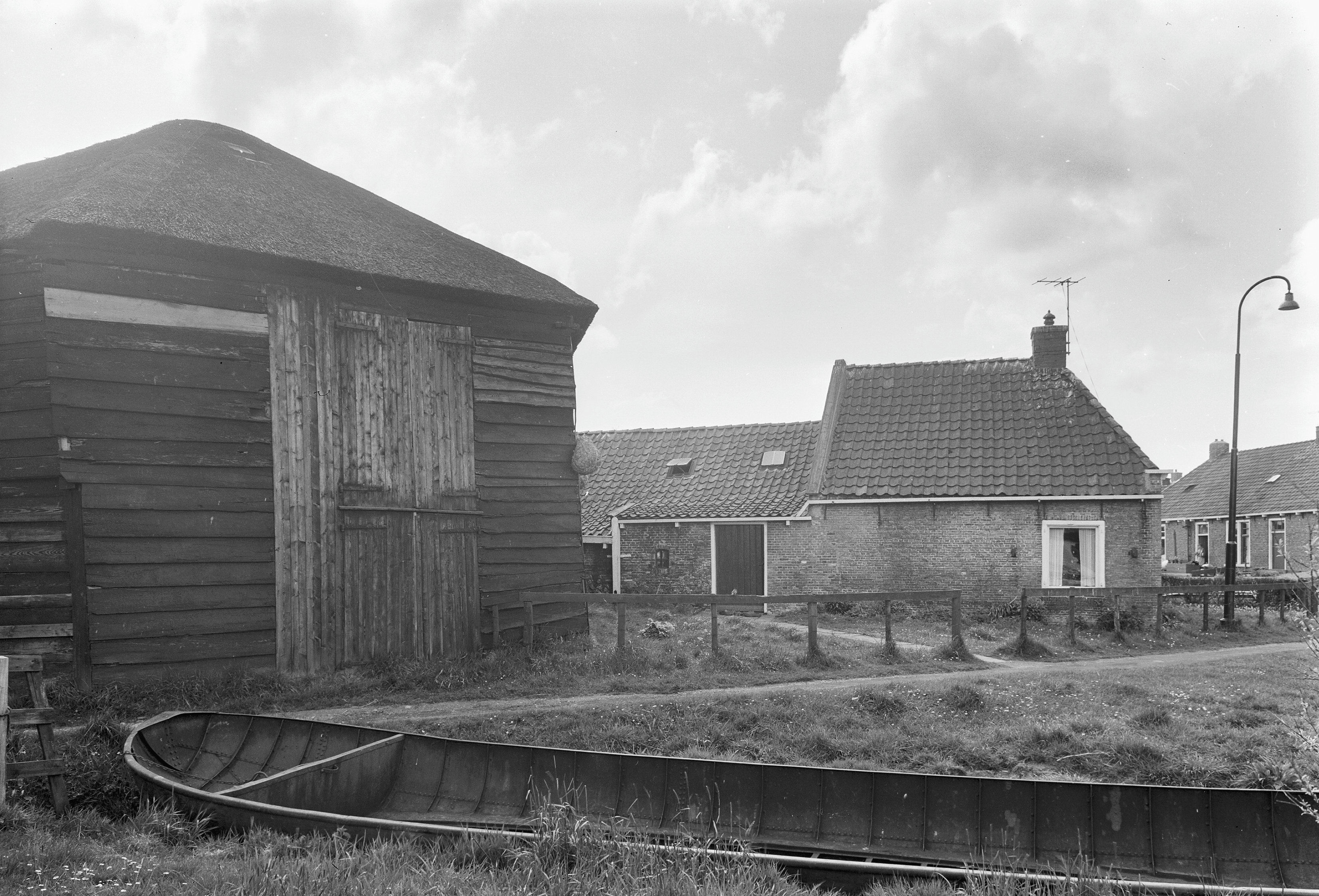
Old Frisian longhouse in Warten, Friesland, 1967

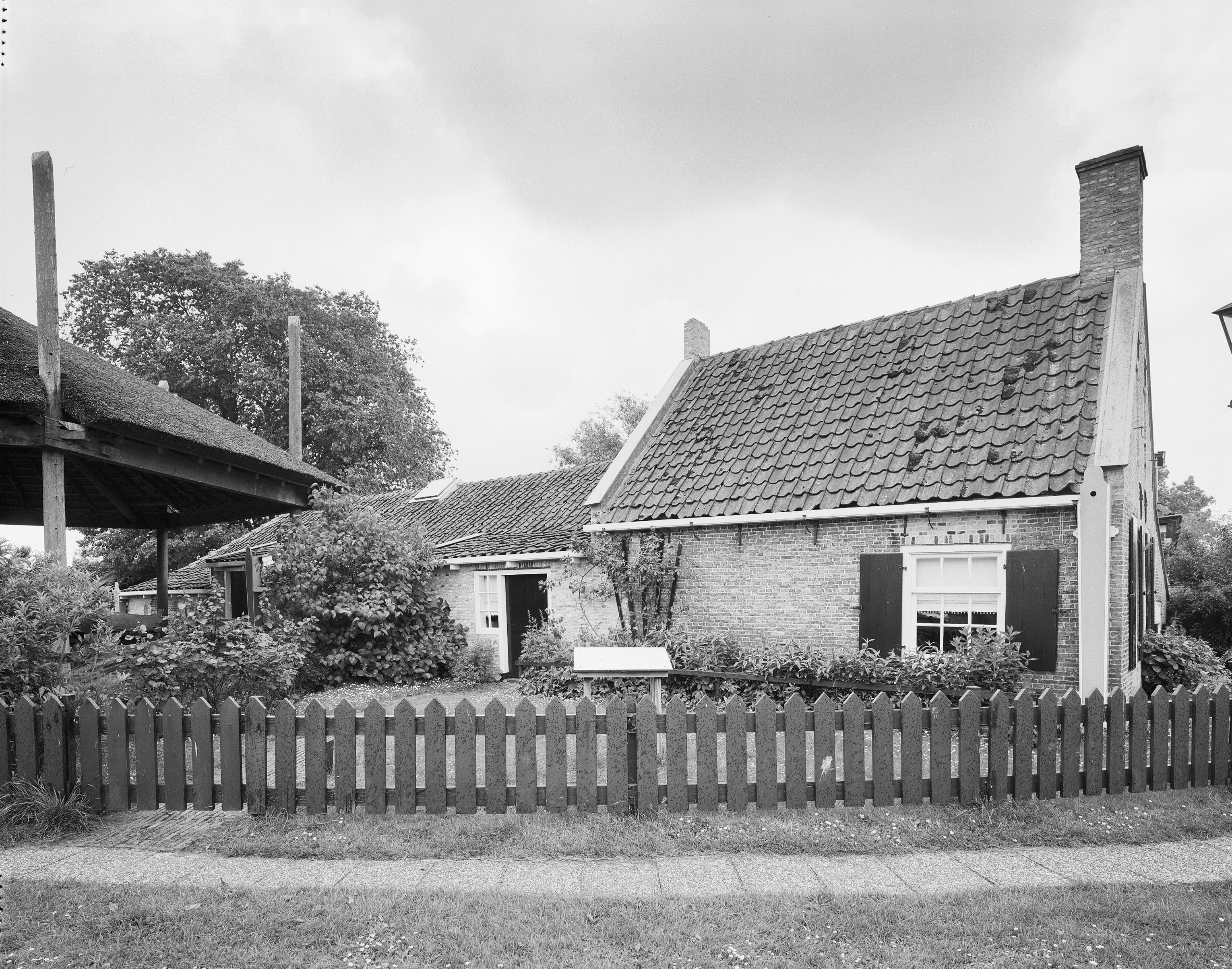
Longhouse in Warten after restoration

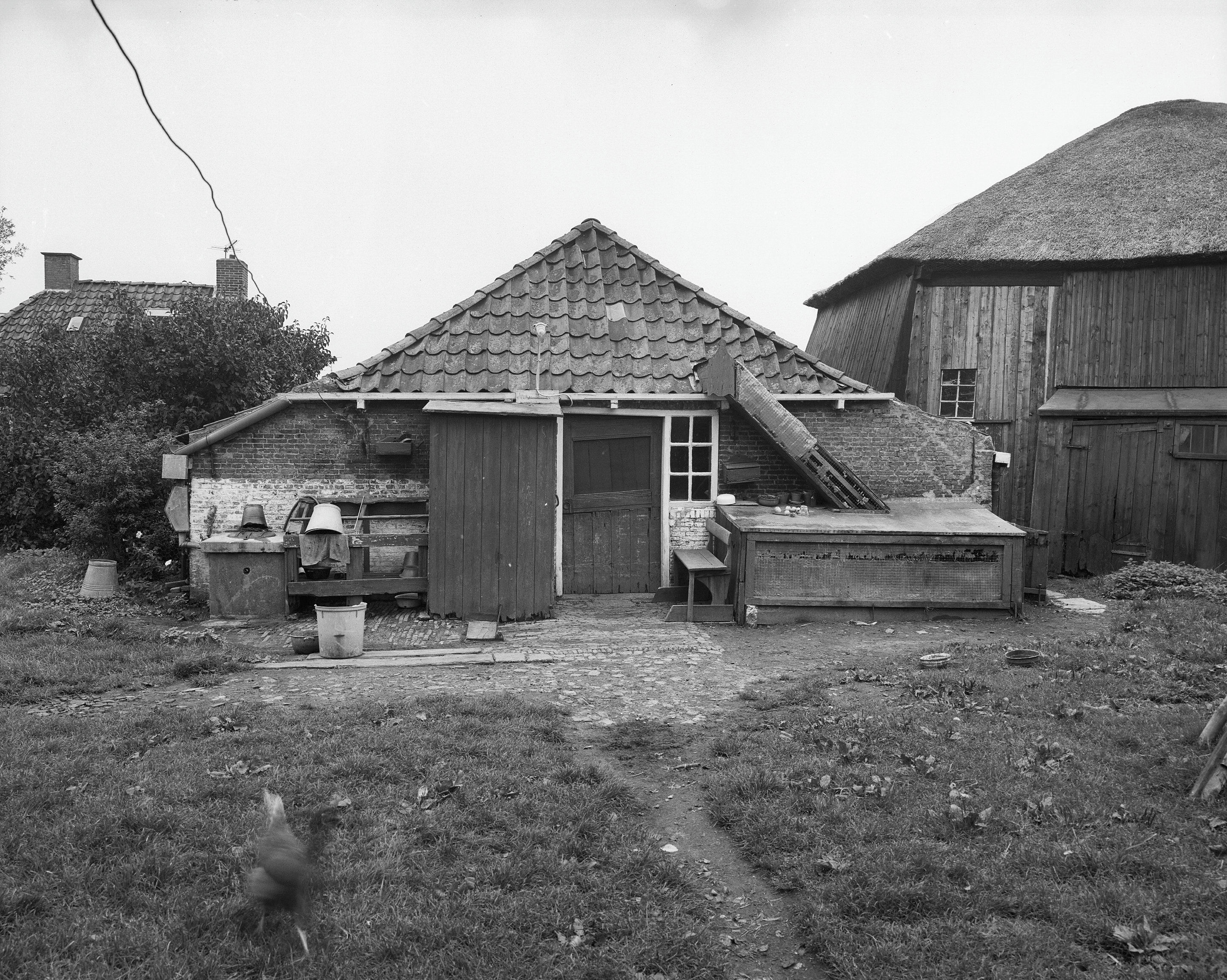
Byre of the longhouse of Wartena, 1967

An old Frisian longhouse (German: Altfriesisches Bauernhaus) was a long-bodied byre-dwelling (Wohnstallhaus) or longhouse that was widespread in the Dutch and Frisian North Sea coastal marshes from the Later Middle Ages until the 18th or 19th century. It combined the farmer's living area with a byre or animals' stall, and had limited space for storing harvest products. It is the forerunner of the "head-neck-body" or Frisian farmhouse, the gulf house and the "stolp farmhouse" or haubarg. Sometimes an existing byre was incorporated into a newly erected Frisian barn, which was built over the old structure. In that case, the horse stable was placed against the rear gable.

The longhouse probably developed — like the Low German hall house — from the prehistoric and medieval byre-dwelling. Archaeologists have uncovered such houses not only in the Frisian marshes, but also in Holland and Zeeland. Counterparts can be found along the French Atlantic coast (maison longue or longère), in England (longhouse), Scotland (blackhouse), Scandinavia, and Iceland. Longhouses also occur in other parts of the world.

The Frisian longhouse was characterized by the fact that people and livestock lived under one roof. In contrast to the Lower Saxon hall house, which was organized around a single central space, the longhouse consisted of several interconnected rooms. Both the longhouse and hall house were three‑aisled and had a continuous timber frame. In other regions, where natural stone was used as a building material, this wooden skeleton was absent.

The longhouse was not the only farmhouse type in the Frisian regions. There were also Frisian districts (mainly upland) where the longhouse was absent and the hall house prevailed. Where arable farming predominated, the farmhouses were in any case broader and the central section more spacious.

== Description ==
The Frisian longhouse usually consisted of a dwelling house, a lower central section with kitchen and dairy room, and an elongated byre. As a rule, the byre was a tie stall consisting of two rows of cows, with their heads facing the outer walls. Between each pair of cows there was a post. The two rows were separated by a central aisle with a manure gutter on either side. On the roof of the living quarters there was in former times a wooden hatch, allowing smoke to escape. From 16th‑ and 17th‑century estate inventories it can be inferred that such buildings were sometimes more than 25 to 35 meters long and could accommodate at least 40 to 60 cows. The smallest longhouses had room for eight to ten cows. Next to the building there were often one or more hay barracks or a separate barn.

Old Frisian legal texts provide detailed descriptions of the layout of the house, which was divided into a byre and stable section, an intermediate space with an entrance door, a living area, and a separate storeroom that was also called pisel or pesel (from Medieval Latin pisale, 'a space where heating could take place'). This latter word is still in use for the parlor of farmhouses in North Frisia and Dithmarschen (Schleswig‑Holstein). The word pijzel (here: 'storage room') is also documented in farmhouses in the southwest of the Netherlands. A ceremonial door was reserved for the arrival of a bride and the funeral departure of the deceased.

The timber-frame probably developed from older earthfast post constructions (type Gasselte B), which were replaced since the 12th or 13th centuries by more durable timber‑frame structures set on stone foundations. The building usually had a tie‑beam truss, but recent research has shown that 16th-century living quarters often featured an anchor beam truss, just like their hall house contemporaries. The timber frame, due to the small spacing between the posts (2 to 2.5 meters), must have shown many similarities to the prehistoric byre‑dwelling. Whether there is continuity with the farmsteads of the Iron Age is uncertain. Excavations have shown that in the early Middle Ages single‑aisled houses (without side aisles) were more common.

Longhouses continued to be newly built well into the seventeenth century, as evidenced by an Amsterdam building contract of 1647. Wooden houses of this type often appear in drawings by Rembrandt and other artists of the period. The transition zone to neighboring farm types, such as the central aisle farm in South Holland, was more or less gradual; the farmhouses of adjacent regions often differed only in the type of stall or the truss construction. The wooden houses in the Zaan region and Waterland also developed out of the longhouse, with the trusses disappearing and the wooden exterior walls becoming load‑bearing.

Dutch and Frisian Mennonites introduced this truncated form in Poland and Ukraine, where their descendants carried it on to North and Central America. In these contexts it is generally referred to as a housebarn. In the Vistula Fens this building form evolved into a new farmhouse type, in which a solid dwelling house with arcades was added to the longhouse. Dutch colonial houses in the New York and New Jersey areas probably developed from the same building traditions.

The Uthland-Frisian house from North Frisia may also have been developed out of the Old Frisian longhouse.

== Warten ==
There were a variety of types, but most have vanished during time. The only intact longhouse is located in the Frisian village Warten. It was mentioned around 1850 by the Frisian linguist J.H. Halbertsma in his Lexicon Frisicum. Halbertsma made an untidy schematic drawing that shows the lines of the outer walls of a longhouse. Next to the farm stood a six post hay barrack. The buildings were surveyed and further examined by farmstead researcher Klaas Uilkema, who published on the subject in 1916. The building has been thoroughly documented and subsequently restored to a reconstructed original state. In a number of older farmhouses in the northern provinces and in Waterland, remnants of longhouses can occasionally be found.

== See also ==
- Uthland-Frisian house
- Frisian farmhouse

== Literature ==
- Rob C. Hekker, 'De ontwikkeling van de boerderijvormen in Nederland', in: S.J. Fockema Andreae, R.C. Hekker en E.H. ter Kuile, Duizend jaar bouwen in Nederland, vol. 2, Amsterdam 1958, p. 195-376
- Kurt Junge, Das friesische Bauernhaus. Seine Verbreitung und Entwicklungsgeschichte, Oldenburg 1936
- Otto Lasius, Das friesische Bauernhaus in seiner Entwicklung während der letzten vier Jahrhunderte, vorzugsweise in der Küstengegend zwischen der Weser und dem Dollart, Strasbourg / London 1885
- Sytze Jan van der Molen, Het Friesche boerenhuis in twintig eeuwen, Assen 1942
- Jan A. Mulder en Ellen van Olst, Het oud-Friese langhuis. Een bijna verdwenen boerderijvorm, Arnhem 1996 (= SHBO-jaarverslag 1991)
- Ellen L. van Olst, Uilkema, een historisch boerderij-onderzoek. Boerderij-onderzoek in Nederland 1914-1934, Arnhem 1991, vol. 1
- Obe Postma, 'Over het Friesche boerenhuis in de 16e en 17e eeuw', in: De Vrije Fries 34 (1937), p. 6-28, repr. in: Ibidem, Veld, huis en bedrijf. Landbouwhistorische opstellen, Hilversum 2010, p. 137-156
- Klaas Uilkema, Het Friesche boerenhuis: Onderzoek naar het ontstaan van het tegenwoordige boerenhuis in Friesland, Leeuwarden 1916
- Harm T. Waterbolk, Wonen op de Wadden: 1500 jaar boerderijbouw op onbedijkte kwelders : met een terugblik op een halve eeuw bemoeienis met het terpenonderzoek, Leeuwarden 2010
- Pieter Wiersma, Een Amsterdams boerderijbestek uit 1647. Een bouwhistorisch onderzoek, Arnhem 1976
