= Cow-calf separation =

Practice of separating calves and mothers

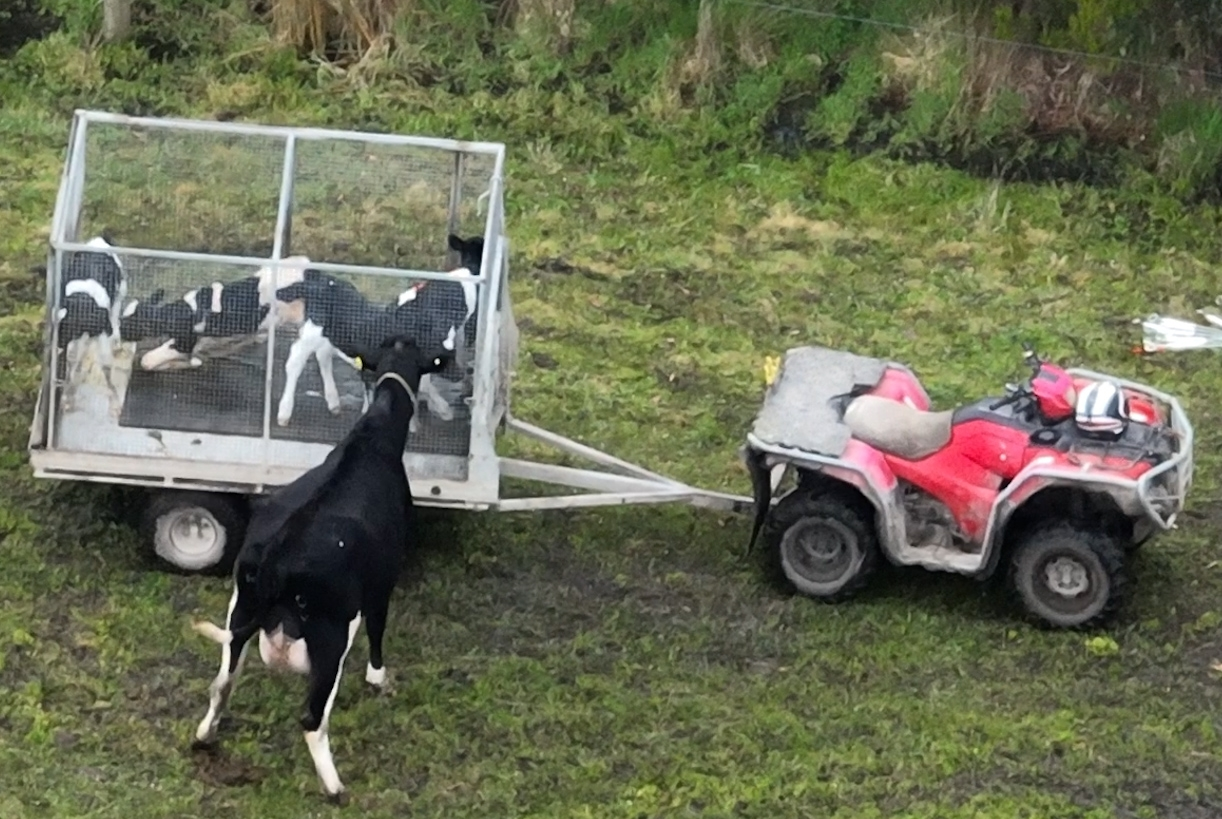
Mother cow sniffing her calf before separation is fully completed

Cow-calf separation is the practice of separating calves from their mothers in the beef and dairy industries. It is sometimes called dam-calf separation. It is near universal within the beef and dairy industries globally. It is usually done within hours or days in the dairy industry, which opinion polling found a majority of the public opposed when they became informed. It is used in both conventional and organic production.

== Background ==
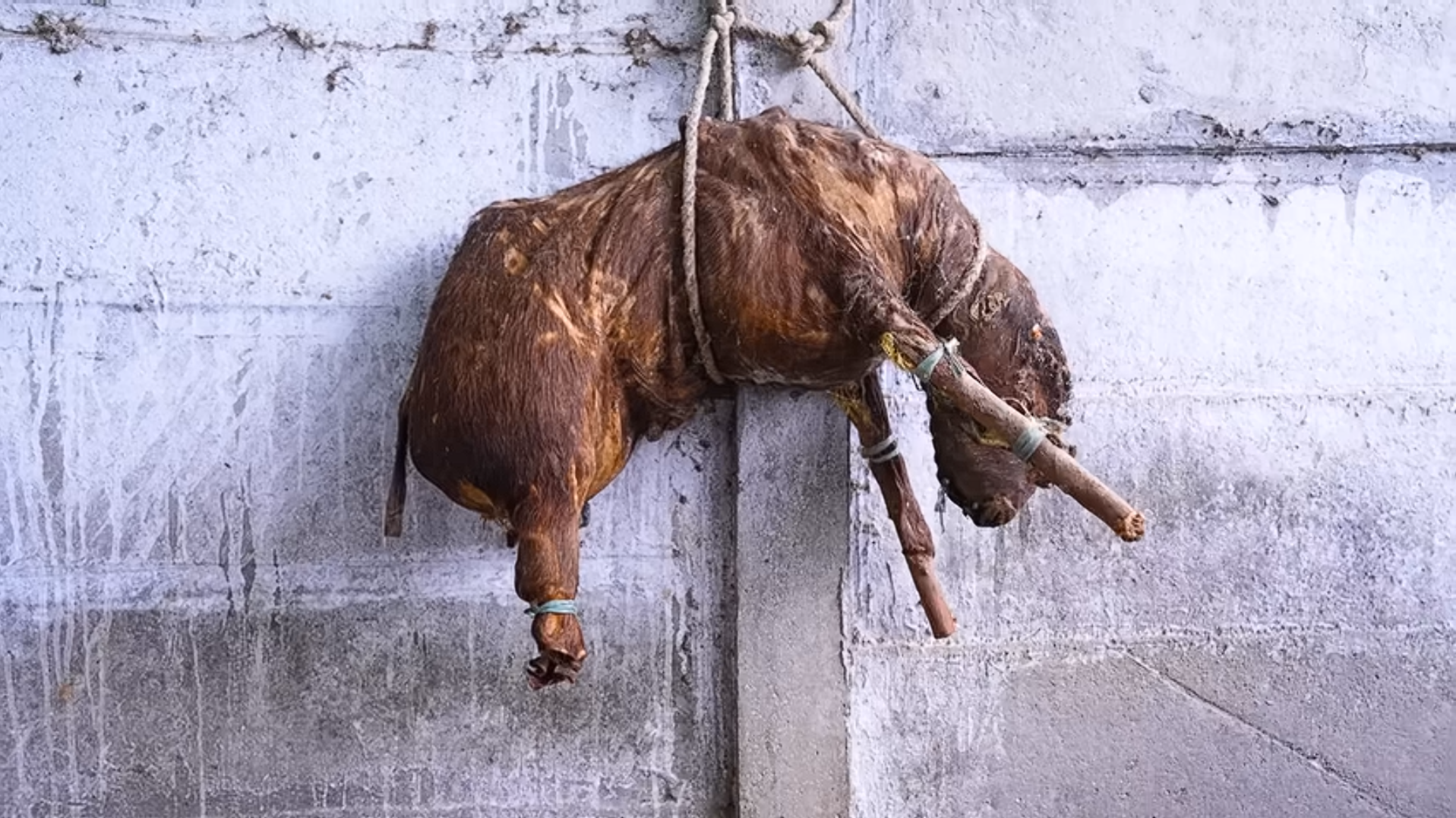
A dummy calf made of straw and calfskin, known as a "khal bacha," hung up on the wall of a dairy farm. When a young calf dies, it is not uncommon for dairy farmers in India to place the dead calf's stuffed body near the calf's mother, causing her to continue lactating.

Dairy cows are repeatedly impregnated to keep them producing milk. This is because after pregnancy, milk production rates fall and lead to a dry period. This process is called the lactation cycle and usually lasts 305 days. It is recommended to wait 45-60 days after a cow has calved before impregnating her again, allowing her body to recover. Dairy cows typically give birth to around 2-3 calves in their life prior to slaughter at around 4-5 years old. Cows that produce the most milk have the highest rate of infertility. Although beef cattle are typically slaughtered around 12-24 months old, beef cows kept for breeding typically give birth to 8-12 calves and are slaughtered when they become infertile, which is at about 10 years old. In countries where it is illegal to slaughter cattle, such as India and Nepal, dairy cows that are no longer lactating are usually exported illegally or abandoned on the streets. Calves in the beef industry are typically separated from their mothers at around 6-8 months old, whereas calves in the dairy industry are typically separated from their mothers within the first few days. Beef cows produce a gallon of milk per day, whereas dairy cows produce six to eight gallons of milk per day. Beef cows are allowed to stay with their herds and typically leave of their own accord within 24 hours before calving, whereas dairy cows are separated from their herd about two months before calving.

Newborn beef calves are temporarily separated from their mothers to perform procedures such as ear tagging, whereas newborn dairy calves are separated from their mothers within hours or days and relocated to prevent the mother from developing maternal instinct, which is unneeded in cows that are not being used for breeding. Moreover, early separation allows dairy farmers to ensure that saleable milk gets sold while "waste milk", or milk that is unsuitable for human consumption, is used to feed the calf, thus maximizing profit. Dairy bulls are seen as unprofitable since they don't produce milk and are a dairy breed. For efficiency, male dairy calves (along with some excess female dairy calves) are usually either sent for veal or killed on-farm within a few days of birth. A handful are sold to a dairy bull semen company. Male calves of beef breeds and dual-purpose breeds may be reared for beef instead. Calves raised for beef are weaned around seven months of age, whereas calves raised for dairy or veal are weaned around eight weeks of age. In countries where it is illegal to slaughter cattle, male calves are usually abandoned or starved to death.

== Effects ==
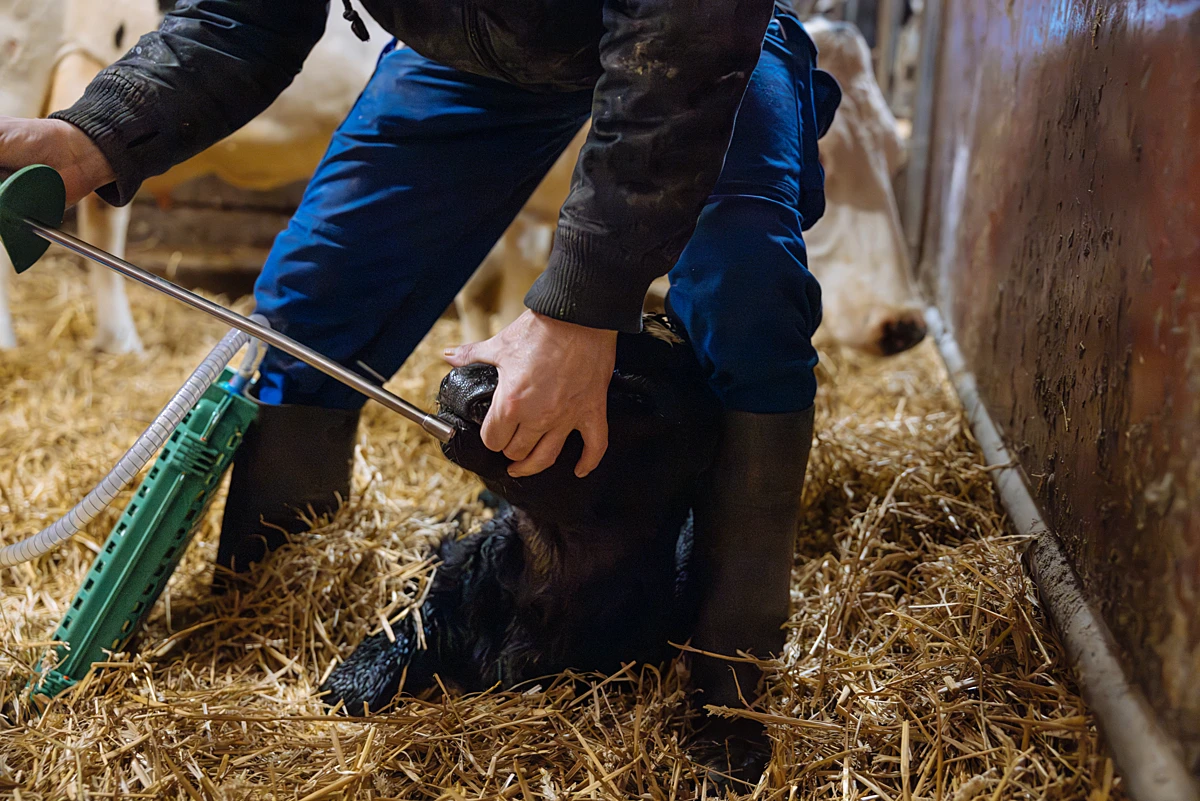
A newborn calf being force-fed colostrum.

Deviations from natural nursing behaviors are thought to have an impact on animal welfare. Veterinarians advise dog and cat breeders to separate mothers from their young at 8-12 weeks of age, while the recommended timing of separation for farmers is not dependent on the animals' wellbeing and instead depends on whether the purpose is dairy or meat production (within 24 hours for dairy calves, 6-8 months for beef calves). While veterinarians advise breeders to not impregnate a dog or cat more than 3-4 times in her lifetime, there is no limit for how many times a farmer can impregnate a cow.In nature, cows often start licking their calves on average 5-7 minutes after birth to remove the amniotic fluid and establish a bond. Around 90 minutes after birth, calves begin suckling. Calves naturally spend large amounts of time nearby their mother compared to other members of the herd and also mimic their mother's behaviors. Cows also often distance themselves and their calf from the rest of the adults in the herd for a few days after birth. Calves tend to remain close to their mother until fully weaned at around 8-11 months old. A 5-year study on social relationships within cattle find that they held stable attachments between mother and child for at least that time frame. Calves in the beef industry are usually either moved from pasture to a feeding pen where their mothers cannot see, smell, or hear them, or placed into a pasture adjacent of their mother. Researchers believe the latter method reduces the stress caused by separation by allowing cows to socialize with their calves.

=== Effects on mothers ===
Post separation, cows in the dairy industry have been reported to vocalize for a while. Stress is higher, activity levels increase, their calls become higher in pitch, and they stick their heads outside pens more frequently. Cows also show reduced milk production after separation.

=== Effects on calves ===
After separation, calves in the dairy industry are known to have increased vocalizations, weight loss or slow weight gain, and increased disease risk. It also appears to lead to higher stress levels with higher catecholamine secretion. The amount of contact or lack thereof with the mother influences calf development. Weight gain improves with at least 4 days of contact. Diarrhea reduces with at least 2 weeks of contact. Social competence improves with at least 12 weeks of contact. Calves with longer contact with their mother also stand earlier post-birth.

Calves in the dairy industry are often placed in individual housing such as calf hutches following their separation. This limits social behavior overall and leads to increased stress and fear. Newborn calves in the dairy industry are sometimes force-fed colostrum through an esophageal tube, which can be stressful and dangerous for the calf if not done properly. Observations obtained at a calf research facility show that suckling a nipple bottle is about 35% faster than suckling the cow, and drinking milk from an open pail is about 85% faster than suckling a cow, putting calves that have been separated from their mothers at higher risk of aspirating fluid that can lead to coughing and pneumonia.

=== Early versus late separation ===
Researchers have found minimal contact is needed to make bonds. 5 minutes of maternal contact after birth with the calf is enough to result in a bond lasting 12 hours after separation. Dairy farmers have often argued for doing separation early to minimize this bond. However, a 2019 review found the effects on behavior were worse with earlier separation. Another review found that changing the time of separation from 24 hours to 10 days did not consistently improve overall cow or calf health. Weary and Chua found that cows vocalized more after separation from their calves at four days than at six hours or one day. Furthermore, increased vocalization when separated from their calves at four days post-partum is accompanied by an increase in the amount of visible eye-white displayed.

In the rare dairy farming systems where cows are separated later and allowed to nurse pre-weaned calves, cows show signs of increased aversion to being milked. Researchers think they are trying to save milk for their calves. "The first year was disastrous. We just couldn't get the cows away from the calves and into the milking parlour. For weeks we'd be dragging the cows in there," reports David Finley, of the Cream o' Galloway at Rainton Farm. "It took a long time for them to trust that the calves were still going to be there when they came back. It was so much stress as the cows just weren't used to it and didn't know what the rules were." Late separation has been found to reduce mortality rates in calves, help calves grow quicker, and reduce mastitis in cows. Finlay estimates that he has lost more than 2,000 litres of saleable milk to the calves, and believes this financial loss is the main reason why late separation is so rare. However, Finlay believes the late separation model is feasible and that the improvement in the health and immune systems of the young calves will yield long-term dividends that will compensate for the loss of milk.

In the beef industry, early separation is defined as separating calves from their mothers at less than 180 days of age, with a range from as early as 45 days of age but averaging about 70–90 days of lactation. Early separation is most commonly practiced when feed is scarce or where breeding cows are at risk from reproductive failure because high nutrient requirements are not met. Early separation has resulted in heavier calves, which researchers interpret as better wellbeing. Cows are less stressed than calves, and behavioral changes induced by weaning are greater in multiparous than primiparous cows. When mutually strongly bonded cows and calves are separated early, cows search and call out for their calves between periods of energy-conserving depression.

== Controversy ==
The separation of newborn calves from their mothers in the dairy industry has faced criticism from members of the general public along with various animal rights and animal welfare groups. For instance, Animal Equality has called it "cruel", "unnatural", and "painful". Animal Justice has called it "some of the worst cruelty in the dairy industry" and called to end its use. Separation of calves from their mothers in the beef industry is notably less controversial than in the dairy industry, due to the timing being closer to when they would naturally wean in the wild.

Opinion polling found much of the public was unaware of the practice; but when informed, a majority were against it. Providing more information and arguments in favor tended not to change the level of disapproval. Moreover, some researchers have found bringing people unaffiliated with the industry to a dairy farm caused a net loss of confidence in the industries' animal welfare, in part due to unawareness of early cow-calf separation.

Those within the dairy industry have offered different justifications for maintaining early cow-calf separation. Decreasing the cost of operations is a commonly cited reason. Also often cited is the physical safety of calves as a reason for separation. Though others argue this is more an issue with the existing housing rather than with keeping calves and mothers together. Another reason cited by the industry has been to separate to reduce disease risk to calves. Researchers do not find consistent support for this claim. Some farmers have claimed that increased time between calves and mothers makes them behave more "wild" and difficult to manage. Other farmers have stated the opposite experience and claimed they are calmer.

== See also ==
- Artificial insemination, typically used to impregnate cows
- Thumping, sometimes used to kill calves after separation
- Veal, a by-product of the dairy industry
