= Calfskin =

Leather produced from the hide of a calf

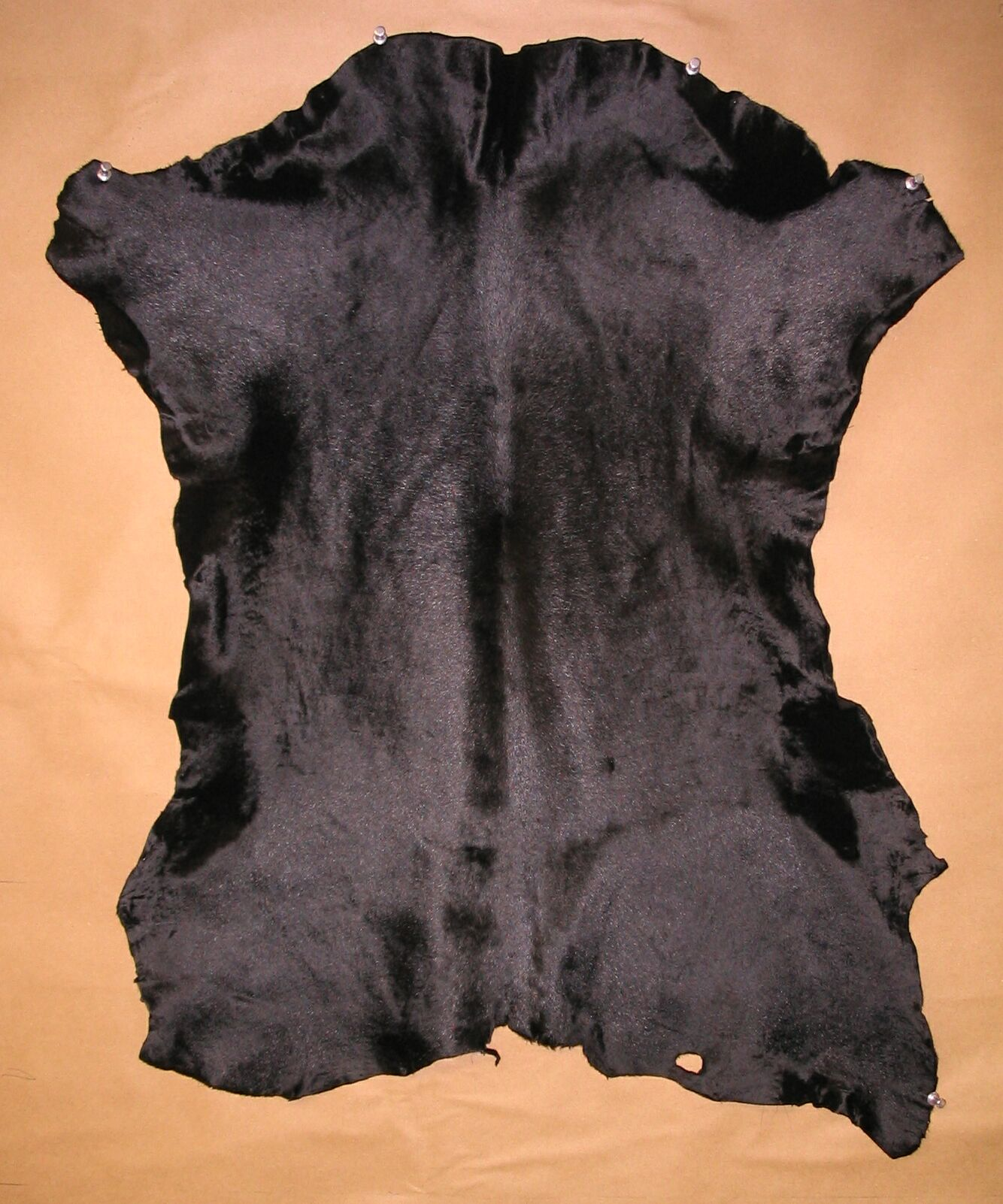
Calfskin leather dyed black

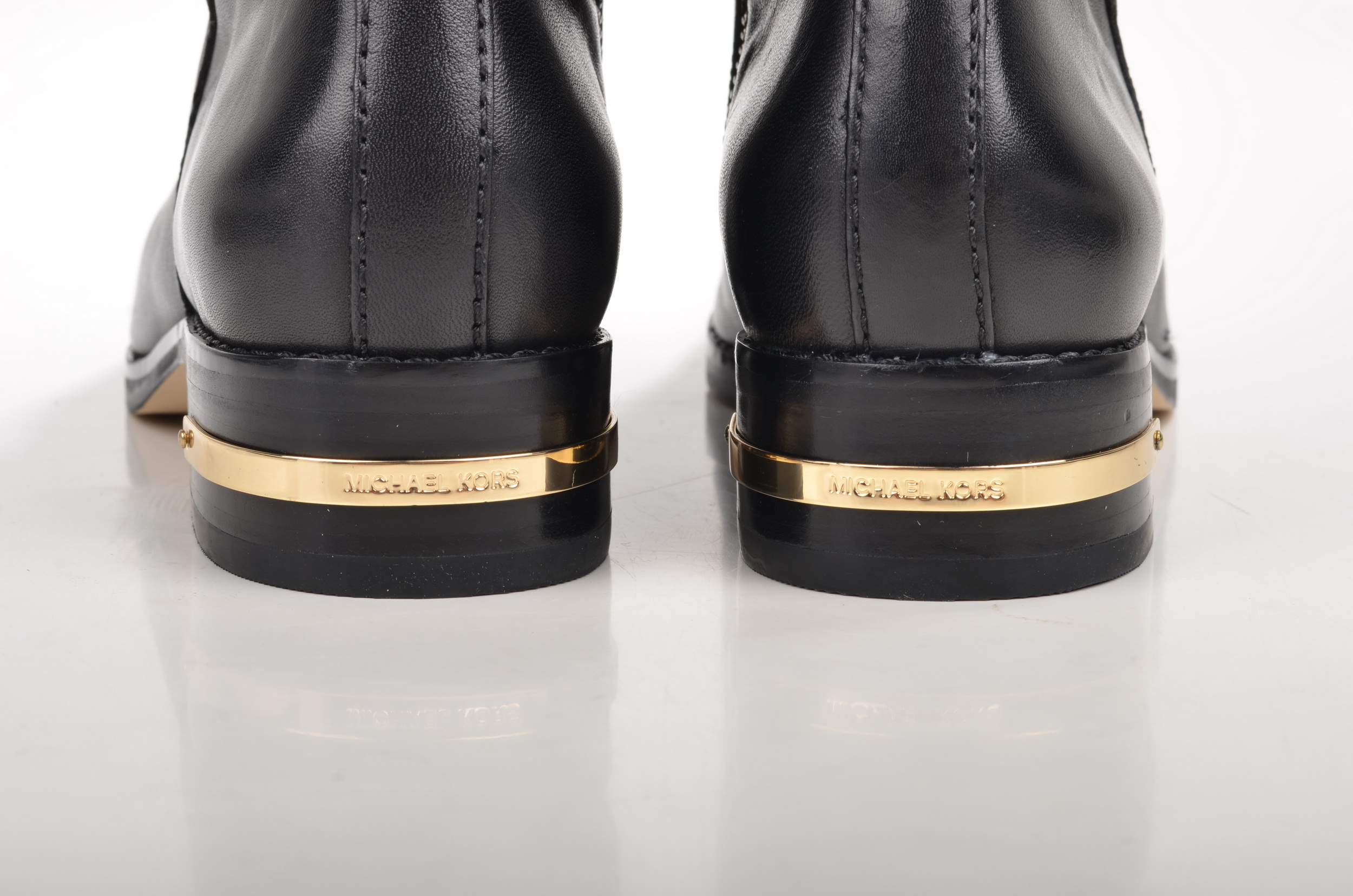
Calfskin leather boot

Calfskin or calf leather is a leather or membrane produced from the hide of a calf, or juvenile domestic cattle. Calfskin is particularly valuable because of its softness and fine grain, as well as durability. It is commonly used for high-quality clothing, shoes, wallets, and similar products, as well as traditional leather bookbindings. In these contexts, just "calf" is commonly used. Fine calfskin is one of the skins used for vellum and parchment manuscripts.

In Spanish, the word is Ternera/Novillo, referring to leather from animals less than three years old. Chickenskin, despite its name, is a form of calfskin made using the skin of unborn calves.

In fashion, soft finished calfskin is sometimes described as veau velours (French for "velvet calf").

== See also ==
- Goldbeater's skin, made from the intestine of a calf
- Sheepskin
