= Calf (animal) =

Young of domestic cattle

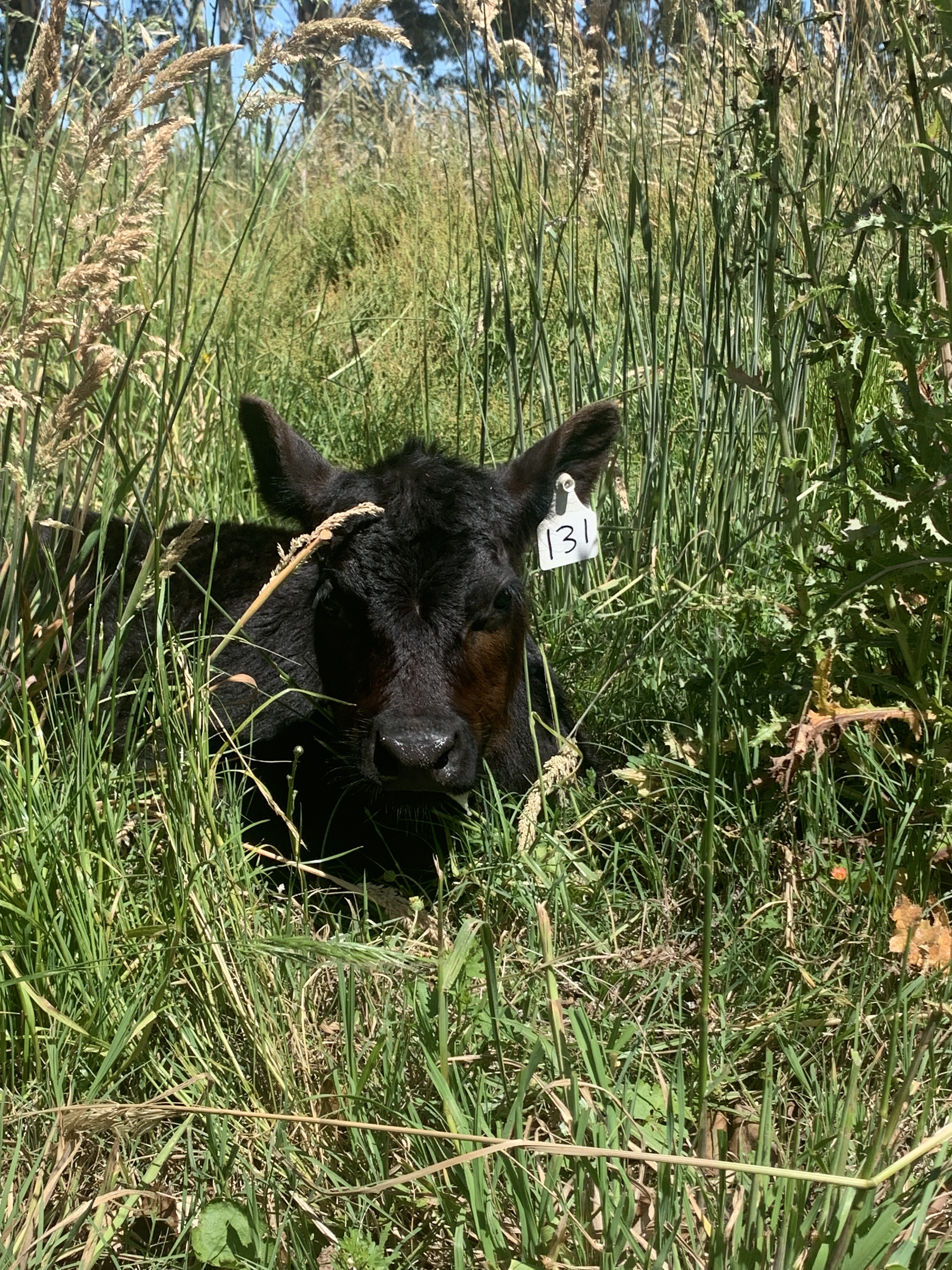
Poddy calf sitting in the long grass

A calf (pl.: calves) is a young domestic cow or bull. Calves are reared to become adult cattle or are slaughtered for their meat, called veal, and their hide.

== Terminology ==
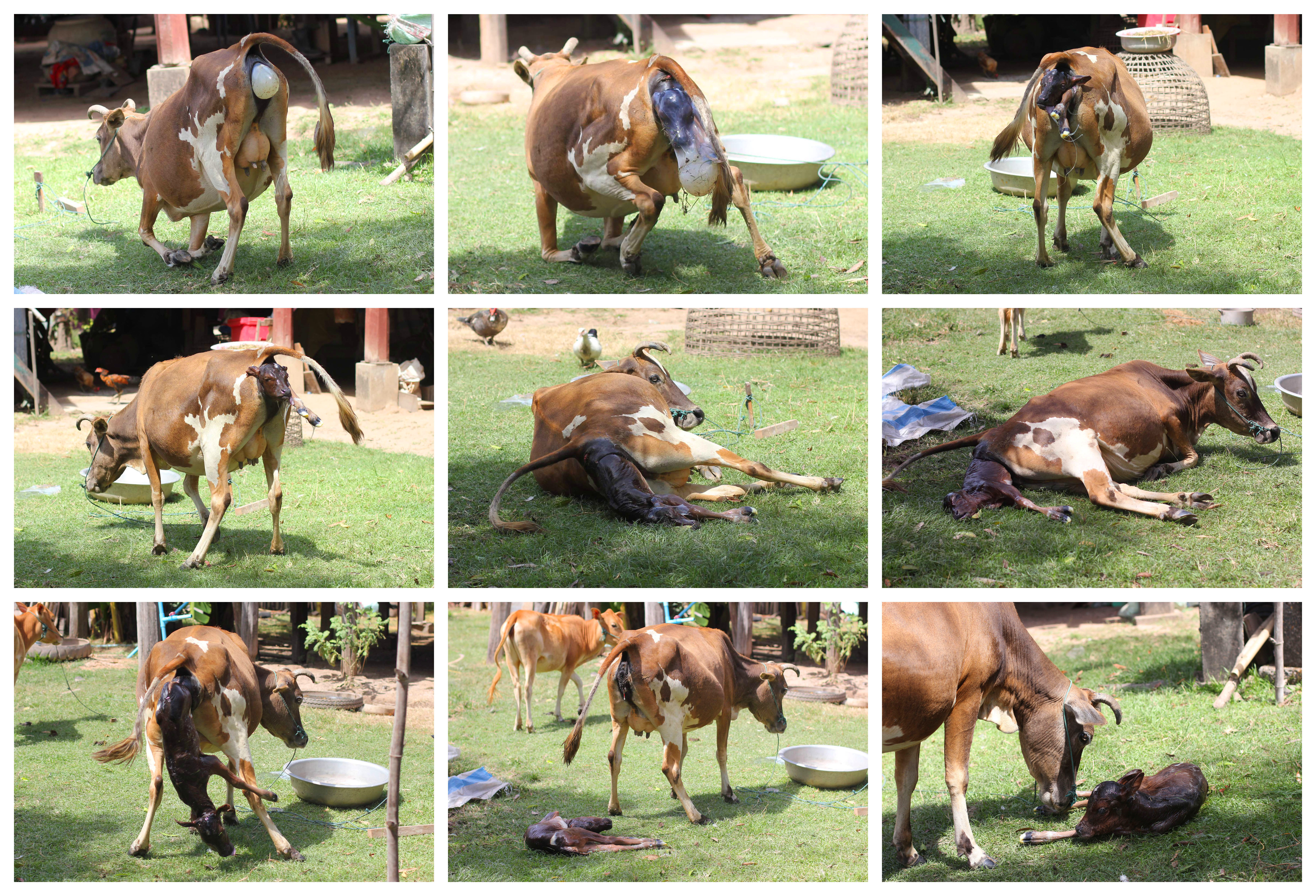
Calving (step by step)

"Calf" is the term used from birth to weaning, when it becomes known as a weaner or weaner calf, though in some areas the term "calf" may be used until the animal is a yearling. The birth of a calf is known as calving. A calf that has lost its mother is an orphan calf, also known as a poddy or poddy-calf in British. Bobby calves are young calves which are to be slaughtered for human consumption. A vealer is a calf weighing less than about 330 kg (730 lb) which is at about eight to nine months of age. A young female calf from birth until she has had a calf of her own is called a heifer (/ˈhɛfər/). In the American Old West, a motherless or small, runty calf was sometimes referred to as a dodie.

== Early development ==
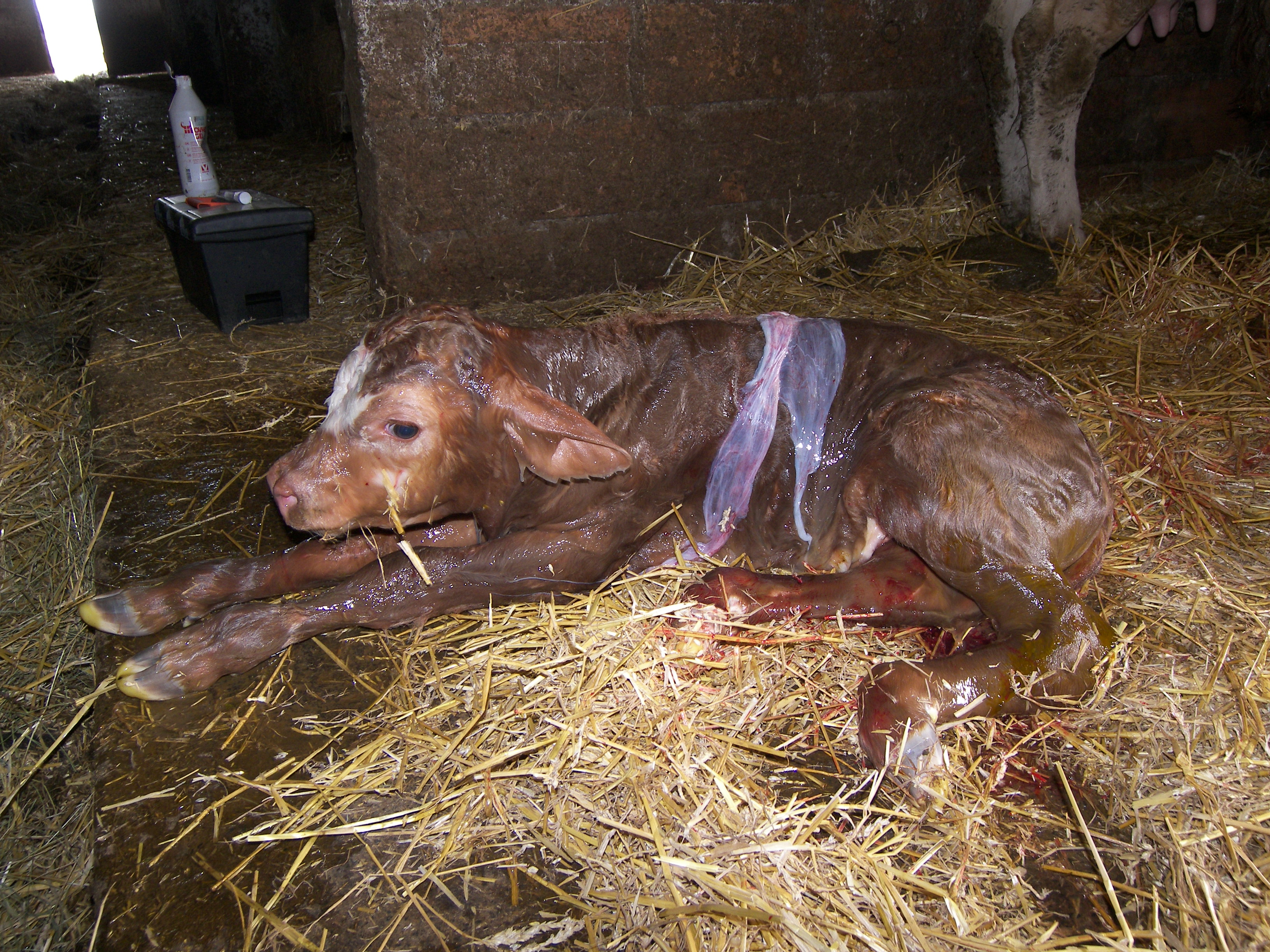
Newborn calf.

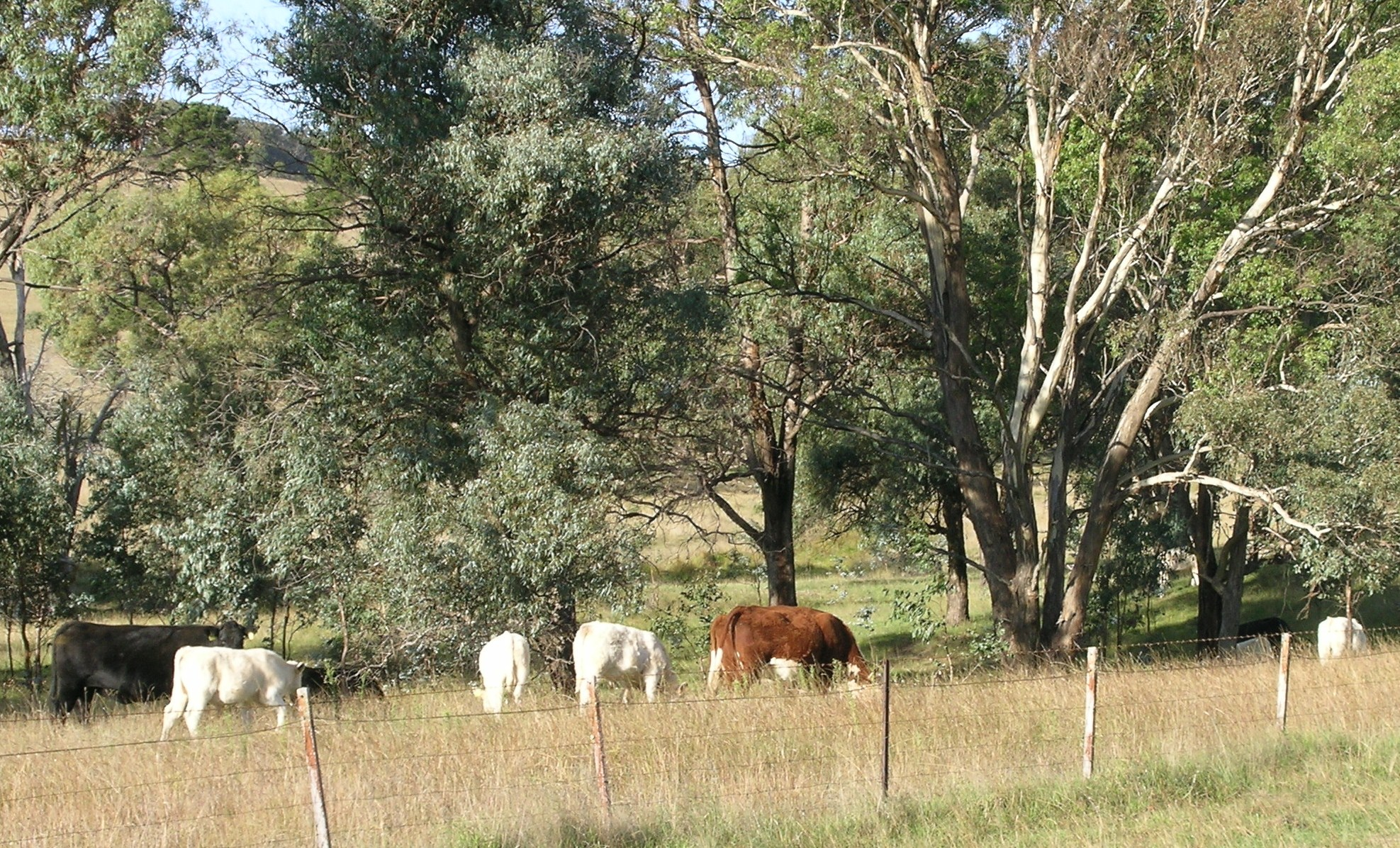
Charolais calves which were transferred, as embryos, into their Aberdeen Angus and Hereford recipient mothers.

Calves may be produced by natural means, or by artificial breeding using artificial insemination or embryo transfer.

Calves are born after nine months. They usually stand within a few minutes of calving, and suckle within an hour. However, for the first few days they are not easily able to keep up with the rest of the herd, so young calves are often left hidden by their mothers, who visit them several times a day to suckle them. By a week old the calf is able to follow the mother all the time.

Some calves are ear tagged soon after birth, especially those that are stud cattle in order to correctly identify their dams (mothers), or in areas (such as the EU) where tagging is a legal requirement for cattle. Typically when the calves are about two months old they are branded, ear marked, castrated and vaccinated.

== Gestation ==
In cows, gestation generally lasts between 280 and 284 days.

=== Endocrine control of gestation ===
The production of progesterone by the corpus luteum is essential to sustain gestation. The corpus luteum, formed during ovulation leading to fertilization, remains present throughout gestation, preventing the onset of a new reproductive cycle. For this reason, cows do not go into estrus during pregnancy. To maintain the corpus luteum and thus gestation, the embryo produces a specific signal that prevents luteolysis, which would otherwise occur at the end of the estrous cycle. Bovine embryos produce and release very early a gestation-specific protein, interferon-tau. This protein inhibits oxytocin receptors in the uterine epithelium and prostaglandin synthesis, which are necessary for the destruction of the corpus luteum.

=== Fetal development ===
Fetal development during gestation
Month of gestation	Fetal weight (kg)	Fetal height (cm)	Gravid uterus weight (kg)	Stage of development
2nd month	0.1–0.2	6 –7	1.3	Limb outline
4th month	0.8–1	14–28	6.5	Appearance of external genitalia
6th month	3–8	25–50	20	Hair on ears, forehead and tail
8th month	8–15	40–60	40–45	Hair on limbs
9th month	20–50	65–85	45–80	Full body hair

=== Premature calving: Abortions ===
Abortions are unusual in cattle. They are often preceded by the death of the fetus, which may be directly affected or impacted by a placental issue. Abortion can be linked to trauma experienced by the animal, the misuse of treatments, or an unbalanced diet containing toxins that could harm the fetus's health. However, the most common cause is contamination by an infectious agent. Brucellosis used to be the leading cause of abortion, but extensive efforts to combat this disease, which could be transmitted to humans, have led to its eradication in some countries, such as France. Salmonellosis does not necessarily cause abortion, and when it does, it typically occurs during the 7th month of pregnancy. Aspergillosis is caused by a fungus found in moldy hay or beet pulp. It can reach the placenta via the bloodstream, sometimes crossing it to directly affect the fetus and cause its death. Listeriosis causes abortion 3 to 4 weeks after the animal becomes infected. Certain venereal diseases, such as trichomoniasis and campylobacteriosis, can also cause abortions. Leptospirosis can shorten gestation, as can bovine viral diarrhea (BVD), chlamydia, or Q fever. Another disease to add to this list is a parasitic infection, neosporosis, whose prevalence in cattle is still not well understood. This disease is caused by a protozoan and was long underrecognized in livestock. Currently, it is considered one of the most common explanations for abortions in cattle.

=== Preparation of the cow before calving ===
At the end of pregnancy in cows, the development of the udder begins to be observed. This development is early in primiparous cows (about one month before calving) and later in multiparous cows (about one week before calving). The udder appears congested, sometimes even edematous. Under the action of hormones, especially relaxin, the ligaments soften. Thus, a relaxation of the sacroiliac ligaments, located at the base of the tail, and a sagging of the udder are typically observed in the 24 hours preceding calving.

A temperature variation is also noted in females ready to calve. In the weeks leading up to calving, the animal's temperature is abnormally high, usually reaching 39 °C instead of the normal 38 °C. Approximately 24 hours before calving, there is a sudden drop in temperature of at least 0.5 °C, lowering it to around 38.4 °C. Farmers commonly use this characteristic as a tool for predicting calvings.

=== Mechanisms of calving onset ===
The calving onset is triggered by a complex hormonal mechanism. The fetus initiates the hormonal cascade leading to its expulsion through the production of ACTH by its hypothalamus. This hormone stimulates the fetal adrenal glands to produce corticosteroids, which act directly on the cow's placenta, prompting it to produce estrogen instead of progesterone. Estrogen, in turn, stimulates the synthesis of relaxin, a hormone produced by the corpus luteum that facilitates the gradual opening of the cervix and the loosening of the sacro-sciatic ligaments. Estrogen also promotes the production of prostaglandins: type E prostaglandins contribute to cervical softening, while type F prostaglandins lyse the corpus luteum, halting its progesterone production. This triggers the first myometrial contractions once progesterone ceases to inhibit parturition. The sharp drop in progesterone levels explains the temperature decrease observed before calving. Myometrial contractions progressively push the fetus through the pelvic canal, further stimulating cervical dilation and the release of oxytocin. Oxytocin amplifies the myometrial contractions, ultimately leading to the expulsion of the fetus.

=== Moment of calving ===
==== Contractions ====
The uterine muscle contractions, or myometrium, facilitate the calf's progression through the pelvic canal during calving. These contractions, known as "colic," begin approximately six hours before delivery. Initially, they are infrequent (every seven minutes) and brief, lasting only a few seconds. As calving progresses, the contractions become closer together and longer. Near the critical moment, they last about one minute and are spaced similarly. These repeated contractions gradually move the calf through the pelvic canal, allowing it to pass the cervix and reach the vulva. Internal tension causes the allantoic sac to rupture, releasing the "first waters."

==== Fetus expulsion ====
Shortly after the rupture of the allantoic sac, the amniotic sac appears at the vulva. This sac also tears under the cow's expulsive efforts. (Note: Sometimes, the amniotic sac does not rupture, which ultimately results in the death of the calf, trapped inside this sac and unable to breathe.) The head and front legs are soon present at the vulva, which gradually dilates to allow their passage. This stage of calving is the most painful for the cow, requiring significant expulsive effort. Once the chest has passed through the pelvic canal, only a few more contractions are needed to expel the entire calf, followed by the remaining fluids from the amniotic and allantoic sacs.

The umbilical cord breaks only after the fetus has completely exited the vulva.

Calving is relatively slow in cows, especially first-time mothers. It can last between 30 minutes and three hours. The separation of the maternal cotyledons from the fetal cotyledons occurs slowly, allowing circulatory exchanges between the mother and calf to continue until the fetus is expelled. This explains why longer deliveries in cows do not significantly reduce the calf's chances of survival.

==== Calf presentation ====
Typically, the calf is positioned in the "dorso-sacral" posture, with the forelegs and head emerging first through the pelvic canal. However, in 5% of cases, the hind legs present first. This variation slightly prolongs calving and reduces the calf's survival chances, as the umbilical cord may break prematurely, potentially causing asphyxiation.

==== Twin births ====
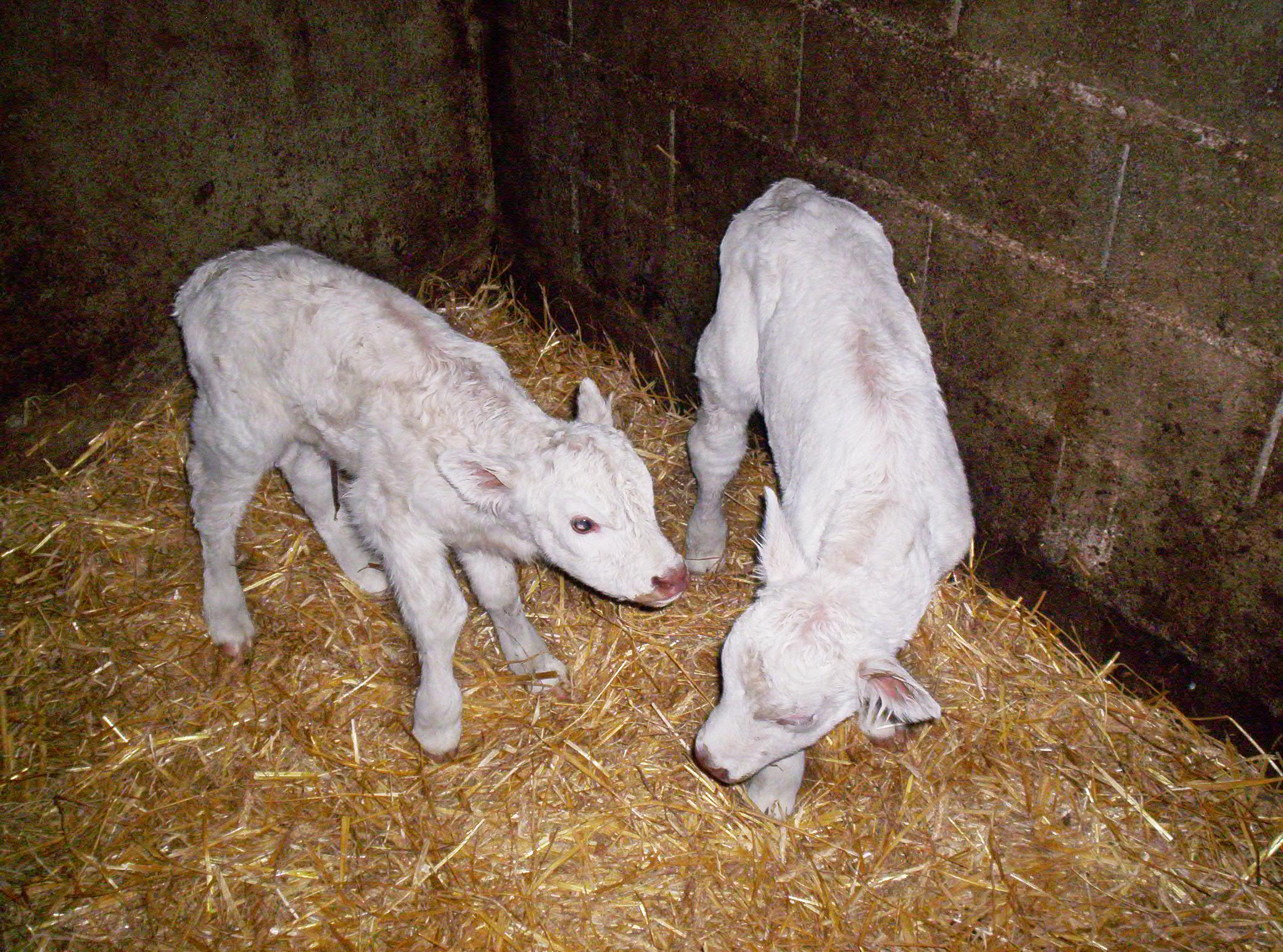
Twin Charolais calves

Multiple births are relatively uncommon in cattle, with the natural twin birth rate estimated at 3%. Twin pregnancies are generally associated with a reduction of 3 to 6 days in the gestation period. However, twin gestations can also have specific consequences on the calving process. While the risk of a size mismatch between the fetus and the mother's pelvis is lower, there is a higher probability of fetal malposition or simultaneous presentation of both fetuses. Furthermore, excessive uterine dilation caused by carrying twins can lead to uterine inertia and insufficient contractions. In twin pregnancies, it is common for one fetus to be in an anterior presentation while the other is in a posterior presentation. Twin calves are often weaker and more prone to neonatal conditions such as anoxia. The rate of stillbirths is also higher in twin pregnancies.

In cases of fraternal twins of different sexes, testosterone production by the male fetus can hinder the normal development of the female fetus's reproductive organs, leading to an increased incidence of sterility in heifers from such pregnancies. This issue is particularly pronounced when both fetuses develop in the same uterine horn, as it increases the likelihood of placental connections. The occurrence of freemartinism is estimated at 90 to 95% in twin pregnancies involving fetuses of different sexes. These mixed-sex twin pregnancies account for 42 to 46% of all twin cases.

=== Dystocia ===
The term "dystocia" refers to any calving that occurs with difficulty and generally requires human intervention to varying degrees, from simple traction to a cesarean section or embryotomy. Dystocia can be attributed to the calf in 60% of cases, the cow in 30% of cases, and in 10% of difficult calvings, it cannot be attributed solely to one or the other.

==== Maternal causes ====
Maternal dystocia can, for example, result from dysfunction of the cow's reproductive organs. One such dysfunction is uterine inertia, which is the inability of the myometrium to contract sufficiently to expel the fetus. This condition may be caused by underdevelopment of the myometrium or insufficient production of prostaglandin F2alpha, a hormone that controls the initiation of uterine contractions. A mineral deficiency in calcium or magnesium can also lead to a lack of contractions, as these ions are involved in the muscle's response to prostaglandin stimulation. Normal fetal progression may also be obstructed by failure of the cervix to open, which is often related to a deficiency in calcium ions (Ca²⁺). Additionally, in first-time calving cows (primiparous), parturition may sometimes be delayed by vaginal and vulvar atresia, a condition that very rarely requires surgical intervention.

The cow's pelvis plays an important role in calving. It forms a bony canal that the calf must pass through during birth, and if it is too narrow, this step may be compromised. The pelvis is composed of a roof formed by the sacrum and coccygeal vertebrae, lateral walls made up of the coxal bones extended by the sacro-sciatic ligaments, and a floor formed by the lower part of the coxal bones and the pubis.

==== Fetal causes ====
===== Fetopelvic disproportion =====
A size mismatch between the fetus and the pelvic canal causes the vast majority of dystocia cases. The issue may stem from the mother, who might have an exceptionally narrow pelvic canal, but it is more often due to an oversized calf. This difficulty is more common in certain cattle breeds whose calves tend to be heavier. The Belgian Blue breed is particularly affected, notably due to the "double-muscling" gene in this breed. However, other factors related to the breed also play a role, such as the cow's age (higher risk in heifers), the cow's weight, the calf's sex (higher risk if the calf is male), and the cow's body condition or fattening level.

===== Abnormal fetal positioning =====
Dystocic calving can also result from an abnormal fetal position that obstructs its progression through the pelvic canal. Human intervention may be required to reposition the fetus properly.

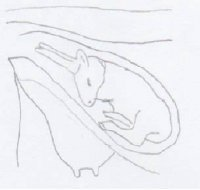
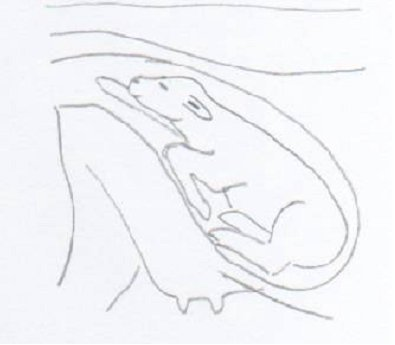
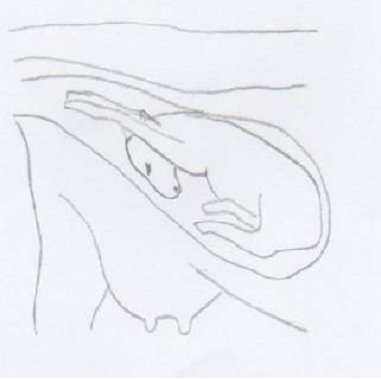
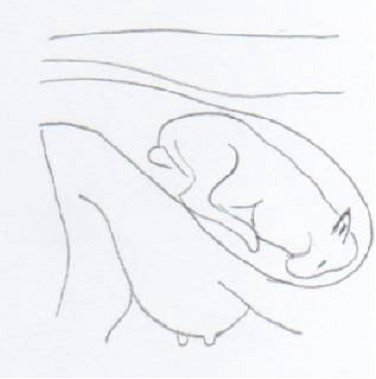
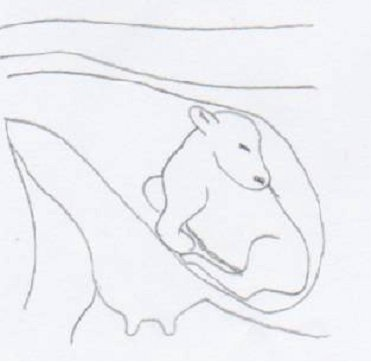
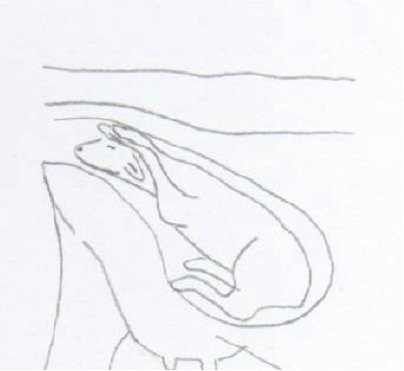
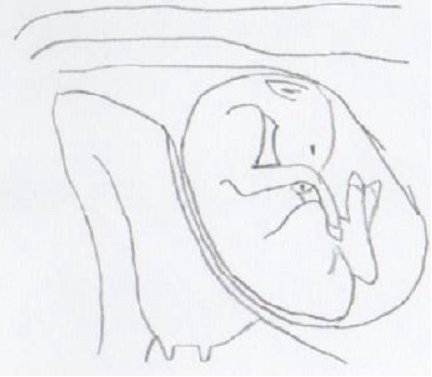
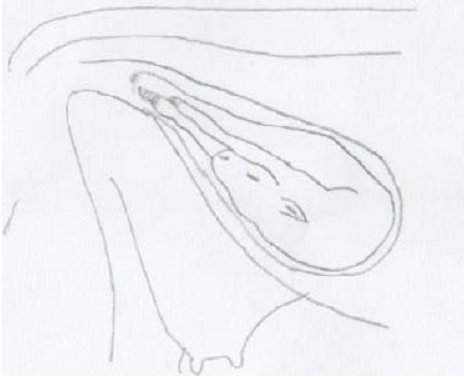

==== Human intervention ====
Human assistance is sometimes necessary to ensure the calving process goes smoothly. This type of intervention is not new. The act of cows giving birth is a frequent scene depicted in Egyptian art, where almost all representations show herders helping cows during calving. This highlights the importance of human intervention as early as Ancient Egypt. Additionally, the Egyptians likely knew how to perform basic obstetric procedures, as evidenced by the "gynecological papyrus," discovered alongside the "Kahun Veterinary Papyrus," which likely refers to animal obstetrics.

===== Traction =====
When the cow's contractions are insufficient to allow for the calf's expulsion, human intervention can involve pulling the calf. To apply traction, calving ropes are tied to the visible limbs of the calf, usually the forelegs. These ropes are connected to a small stick that makes it easier for the person to exert force. However, mechanical assistance is sometimes necessary to provide sufficient pulling power. Calving devices can exert a traction force of up to 450 kg, compared to the 70 kg force generated by the cow's contractions.

===== Caesarean section =====
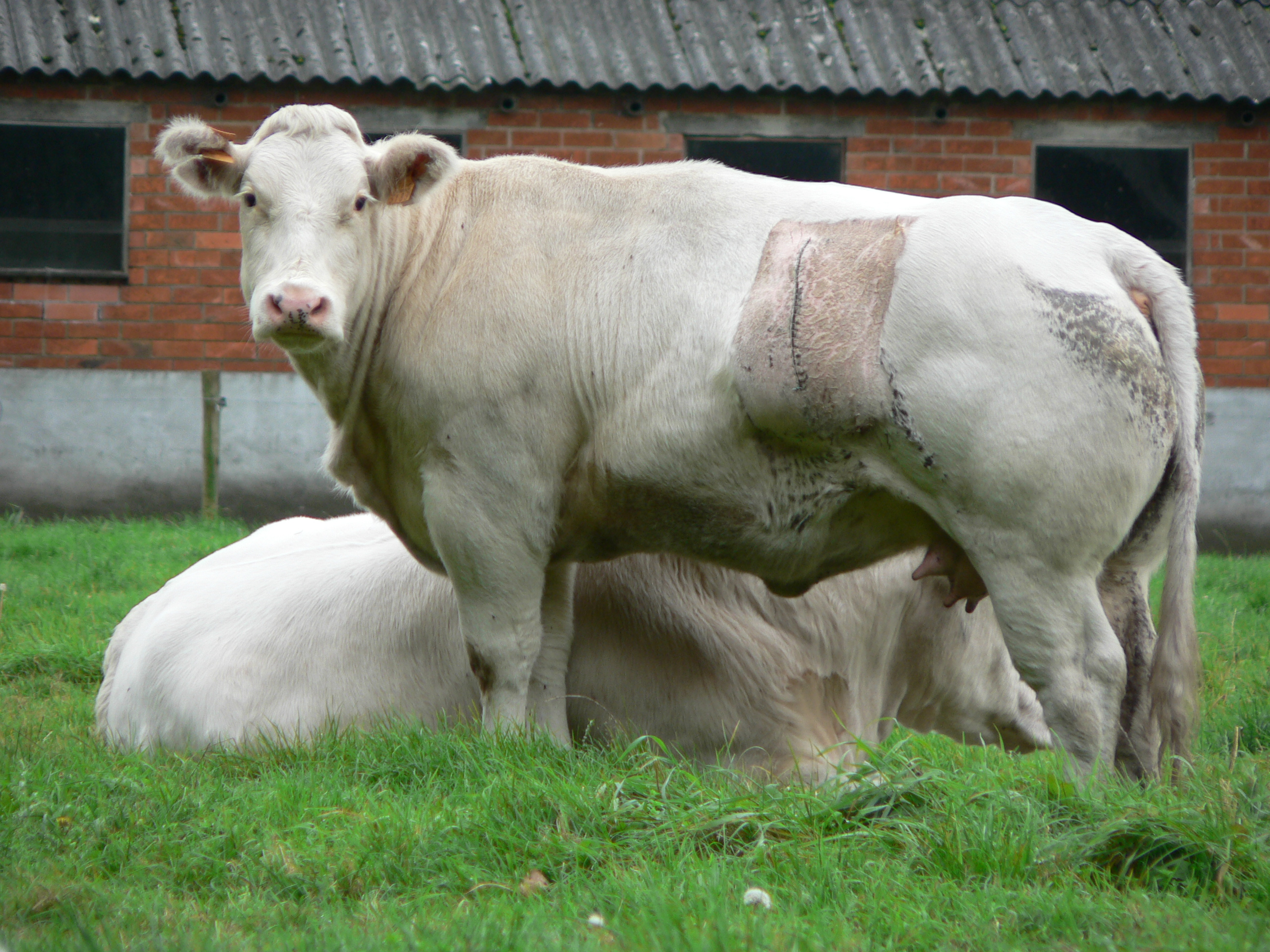
Belgian white-blue cow with Cesarean section.

A cesarean section allows the calf to be delivered without passing through the natural birth canal, which becomes essential when the calf is too large for the mother's pelvic opening. The frequency of cesarean sections varies significantly across cattle breeds. They are very common in Belgian Blue cattle, with 69% of calvings performed by cesarean section, relatively common in Charolais cattle (4% of calvings), and rare in other breeds.

Caesarean sections are usually performed on the left side to avoid interference from the intestines, but they can also be done on the right side.

===== Embryotomy =====
Embryotomy is a procedure used to extract the calf when it is dead and cannot be delivered by traction without risking the cow's health. This involves cutting the calf into several parts. It is a bloody obstetrical method and was the only option available before the 1950s when caesarean section techniques became more widespread.

===== Complications =====
Human intervention during calving can result in various complications. First, the traction applied to the calf can cause injuries to the cow's genital tract. Additionally, the calf's anterior part can progress as far as the thorax while the posterior part remains stuck—a condition known as incarcerated calf. The calf's survival is compromised in this situation because of pressure on its umbilical cord. If the anterior part of the calf is delivered without difficulty, the calf can typically survive for 5 to 7 minutes in this state. If the anterior part's extraction is challenging, the calf is less likely to survive incarceration.

==== Consequences of dystocia in livestock farming ====
Dystocia has various adverse effects on livestock farming. It significantly increases the risk of stillbirths, and surviving calves are more prone to early mortality and diseases, as their immunity is often compromised. For the mother, dystocic calving raises the risk of mortality, reduces future fertility, and increases susceptibility to postpartum diseases.

Additionally, dystocia carries direct economic costs for the farmer, including veterinary expenses.

=== Young calf ===
==== Stillbirth ====
===== Genetic anomalies and congenital defects =====
Simple monsters correspond to a single, more or less malformed fetus. These include autosites, omphalosites, and parasites, which form a shapeless mass, lacking a proper umbilical cord, and implanted directly onto the uterine walls via a vascular plexus, as well as anidians, spherical masses covered in hair containing muscle, fat, and bone tissue, all connected to the uterus.

Calves suffer from few congenital abnormalities but the Akabane virus is widely distributed in temperate to tropical regions of the world. The virus is a teratogenic pathogen which causes spontaneous abortions, stillbirths, premature births and congenital abnormalities, but occurs only during some years.

Double monsters are true twins that have not been completely separated. They can take various forms. Eusophalians and monophalians have two heads and four pairs of limbs, joined at some part of the body, typically the ventral and sternal walls. Some monsters have a body normally formed with two pairs of limbs but are equipped with two heads (monosomians) or two heads and two thoraxes (sysomians). In contrast, sycéphalians and monocéphaliens have a double body joined into a single head or with parts of the head in common. Sometimes, one of the fetuses is incomplete, reduced to one or two limbs, and is implanted on the other fully developed fetus, living parasitically on it.

===== Neonatal diseases =====
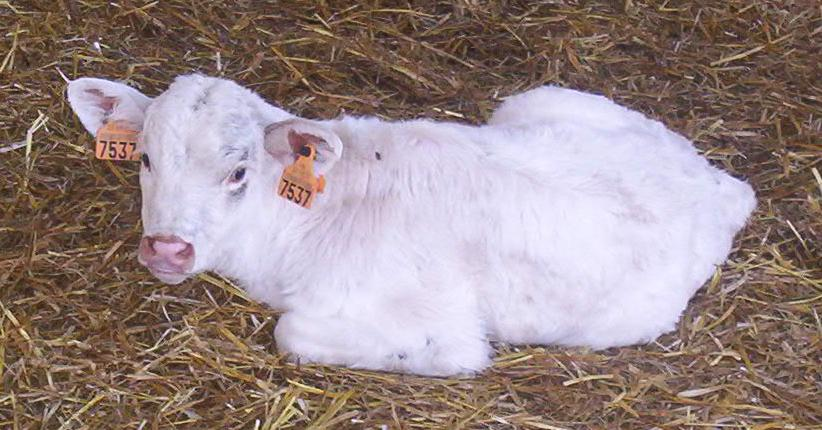
Charolais veal lying in straw.

The main risk that a calf faces during calving is a lack of oxygen or anoxia. This can occur for various reasons. Firstly, when a cow is already exhausted from a difficult birth, the calf's oxygen supply during delivery is not guaranteed. Moreover, if the calving process is prolonged, the oxygen supply to the calf is interrupted about six hours after the rupture of the water bag, as the placenta begins to detach. Anoxia is a contributing cause of another common disease in newborn calves: hypothermia. This is generally linked to harsh environmental conditions following birth.

Another common disease in newborns is omphalitis. This refers to an inflammation of the umbilicus. The microbes responsible for the infection can travel along the umbilical veins and cause complications such as abscesses in the liver and bladder, as well as arthritis or peritonitis. Symptoms include hypothermia, lethargy, and swelling of the umbilicus.

Calves commonly face on-farm acquired diseases, often of infectious nature. Preweaned calves most commonly experience conditions such as diarrhea, omphalitis, lameness and respiratory diseases. Diarrhea, omphalitis and lameness are most common in calves aged up to two weeks, while the frequency of respiratory diseases tends to increase with age. These conditions also display seasonal patterns, with omphalitis being more common in the summer months, and respiratory diseases and diarrhea occurring more frequently in the fall.

=== The cow after calving ===
==== Delivery of the placenta ====
Within 24 hours following calving, the female expels the fetal membranes. Sometimes, this final stage of calving does not occur as expected, and this is known as retained placenta. Retained placenta is fairly common in livestock, especially in dairy cows, affecting 10% of animals, compared to 6% in beef cattle. Retained placenta can lead to complications such as delayed uterine involution or metritis.

==== Uterine involution ====
Throughout pregnancy, the uterus has lengthened and increased in volume to accommodate the fetus. It must then return to its normal size in preparation for the next pregnancy. This required process is called uterine involution, during which the uterus shrinks from a weight of 10 kg to 500 g, and from a length of 1 meter to 15 cm. It usually lasts around 1 month. The involution of the cervix takes a bit longer, approximately 45 days. Involution is an inflammatory process supported by an influx of polymorphonuclear white blood cells in the uterus. Using anti-inflammatory medications, for example, to treat metritis, will slow down this involution and delay the cow's return to estrus.

==== Pathologies that may follow calving ====
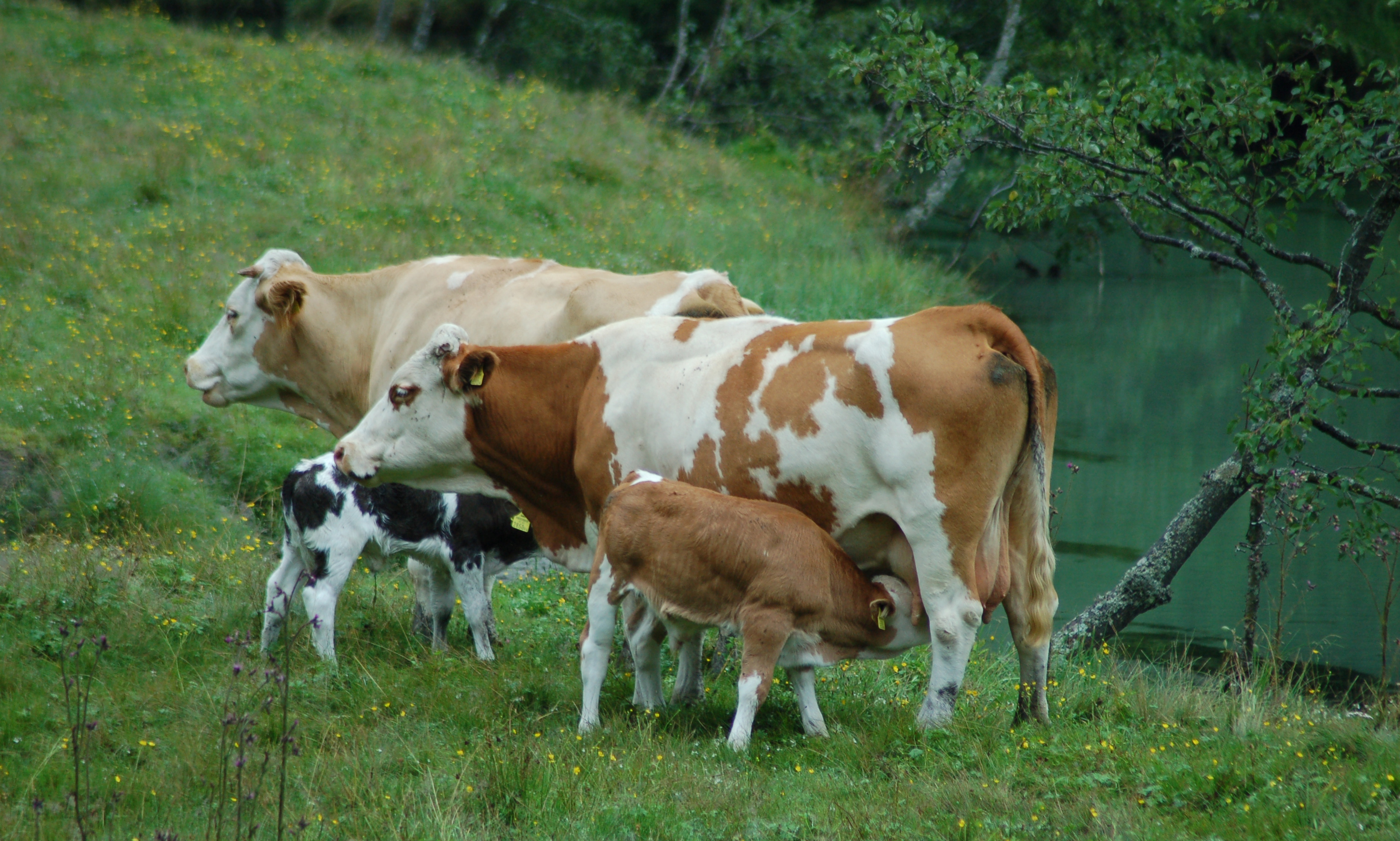
Cows suckling calves.

Calving, especially if it has been difficult or followed by retained placenta, can lead to metritis. This uterine inflammation is caused by a microbial infection facilitated by the opening of the cervix at that time. It is characterized by fever, reduced appetite and production, and purulent, foul-smelling vaginal discharge.

Dairy cows sometimes suffer from a metabolic disease known as milk fever or parturient fever. This condition typically develops within 48 hours after calving. It is hypocalcemia linked to an excess of calcitonin, the hormone that reduces calcium mobilization from bone reserves. This hormone prevents the animal from drawing on its normal calcium reserves at a time when the demand is very high, as 1 liter of colostrum contains 1.7 g of calcium. Milk fever manifests as the animal's inability to rise, which may be followed by coma and trembling. Milk fever is treated by injecting calcium gluconate to restore calcium levels. It can be prevented by administering vitamin D3 in the days leading up to calving.

== Mother-calf bond ==
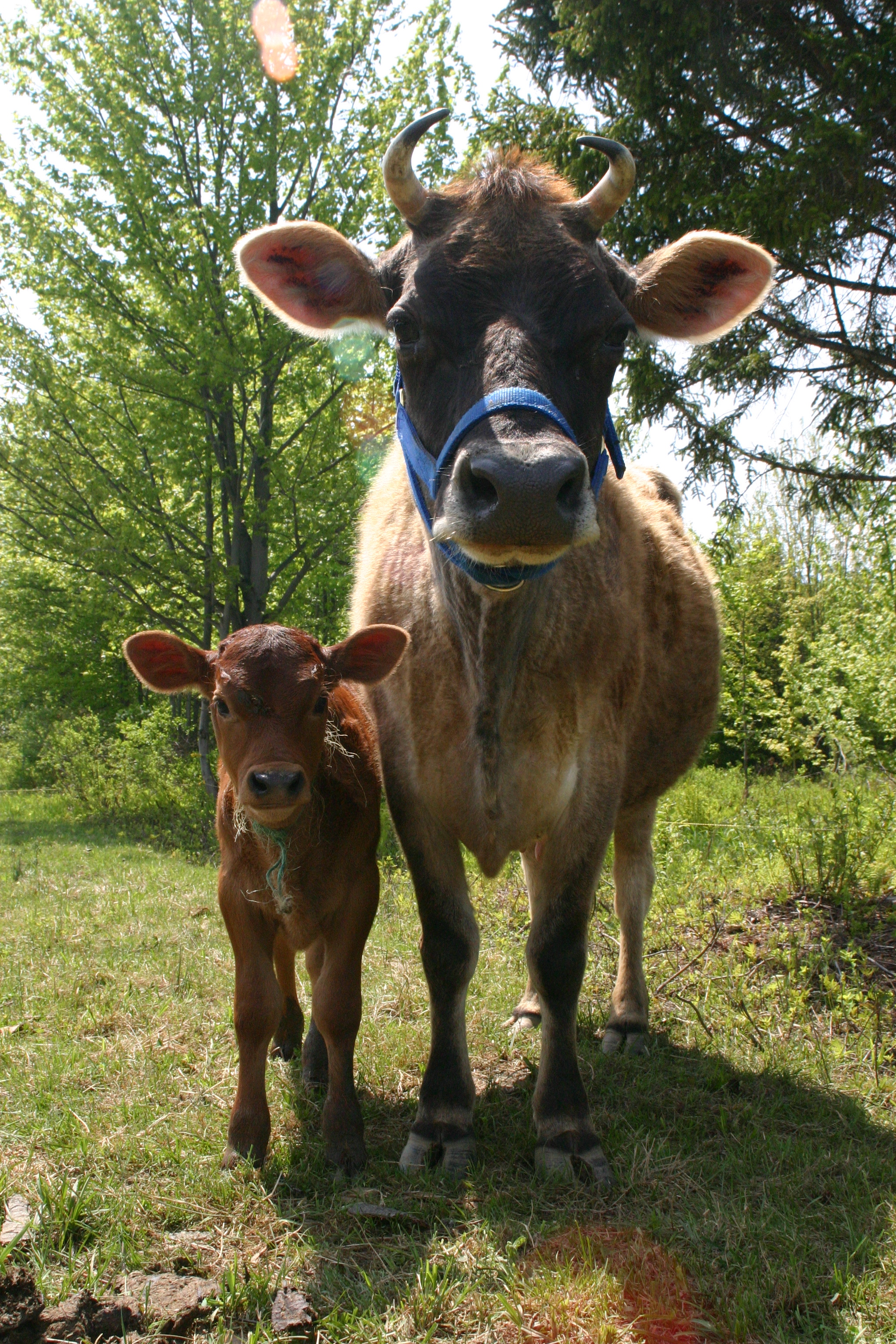
Jersey cow with calf.

The relationship between the mother and her calf is established within hours of calving, and its quality is crucial for the calf's survival. Shortly before giving birth, the cow tends to isolate herself, which prevents other herd members from interfering with her interaction with the calf. Maternal behavior during parturition is influenced by oxytocin levels. This hormone facilitates the recognition and memory of the calf. First-time mothers (primiparous cows) are less experienced and produce lower amounts of oxytocin, which can impact their maternal behavior. Immediately after calving, the cow is strongly attracted to the amniotic fluid and quickly approaches her calf. She carefully licks it until it is dry.

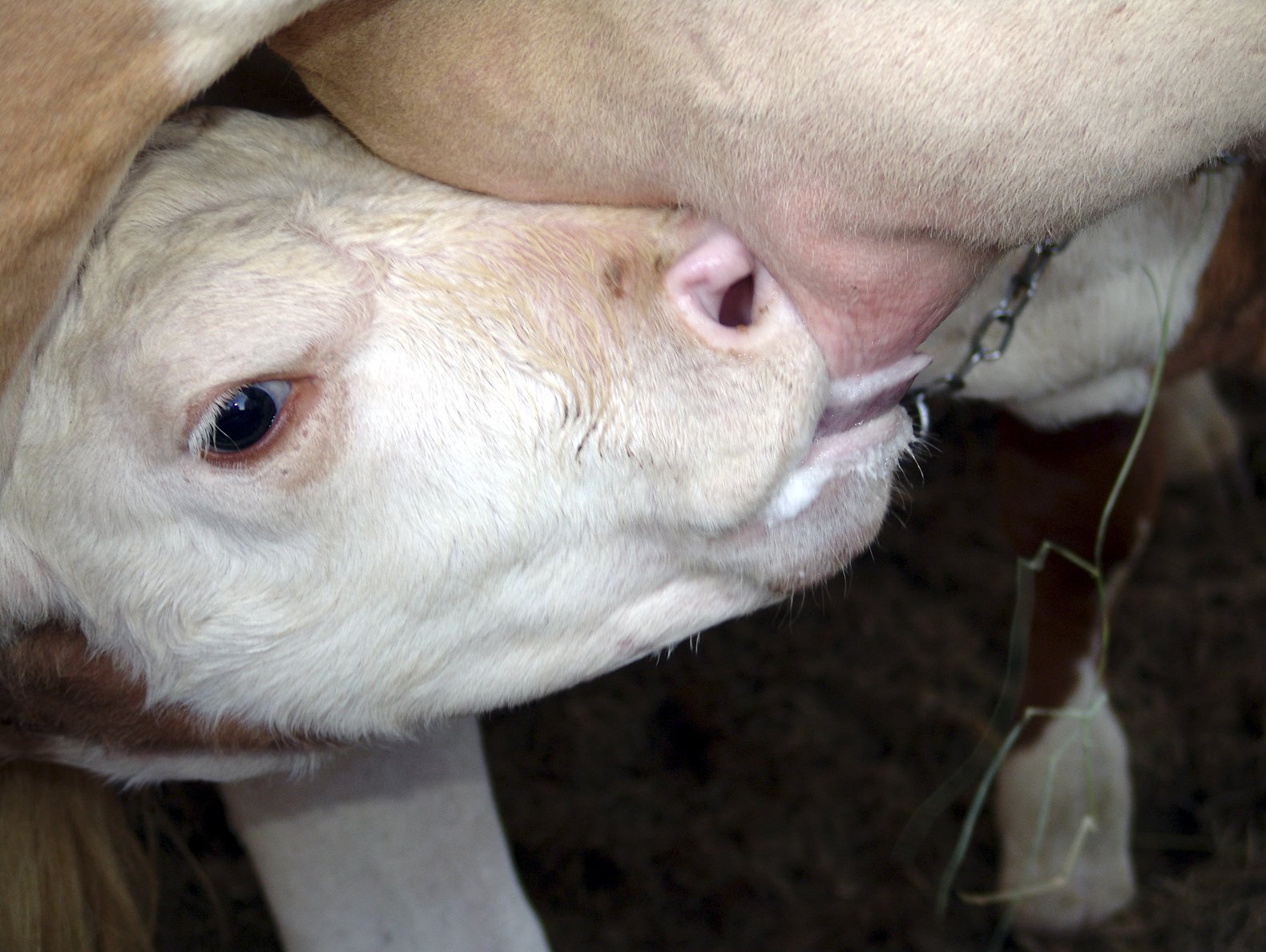
Calf suckling its mother.

The calf must then nurse from its mother. The milk produced by the cow in the days following calving is called colostrum. Colostrum is exceptionally rich in vitamins and, most importantly, immunoglobulins, which provide the calf with its first immunity. The colostrum must be ingested as quickly as possible after birth. Over time, the cow's milk secretion becomes less concentrated in immunoglobulins, and the calf's intestinal wall becomes less permeable to these antibodies. This is why it is recommended that colostrum be consumed within 12 hours of calving.

== Calf rearing systems ==
The single suckler system of rearing calves is similar to that occurring naturally in wild cattle, where each calf is suckled by its own mother until it is weaned at about nine months old. This system is commonly used for rearing beef cattle throughout the world.

Cows kept on poor forage (as is typical in subsistence farming) produce a limited amount of milk. A calf left with such a mother all the time can easily drink all the milk, leaving none for human consumption. For dairy production under such circumstances, the calf's access to the cow must be limited, for example by penning the calf and bringing the mother to it once a day after partly milking her. The small amount of milk available for the calf under such systems may mean that it takes a longer time to rear, and in subsistence farming it is therefore common for cows to calve only in alternate years.

In more intensive dairy farming, cows can easily be bred and fed to produce far more milk than one calf can drink. In the multi-suckler system, several calves are fostered onto one cow in addition to her own, and these calves' mothers can then be used wholly for milk production. More commonly, calves of dairy cows are fed formula milk from soon after birth, usually from a bottle or bucket.

Purebred female calves of dairy cows are reared as replacement dairy cows. Most purebred dairy calves are produced by artificial insemination (AI). By this method each bull can serve many cows, so only a very few of the purebred dairy male calves are needed to provide bulls for breeding. The remainder of the male calves may be reared for beef or veal. Only a proportion of purebred heifers are needed to provide replacement cows, so often some of the cows in dairy herds are put to a beef bull to produce crossbred calves suitable for rearing as beef.

Veal calves may be reared entirely on milk formula and killed at about 18 or 20 weeks as "white" veal, or fed on grain and hay and killed at 22 to 35 weeks to produce red or pink veal.

== Growth ==
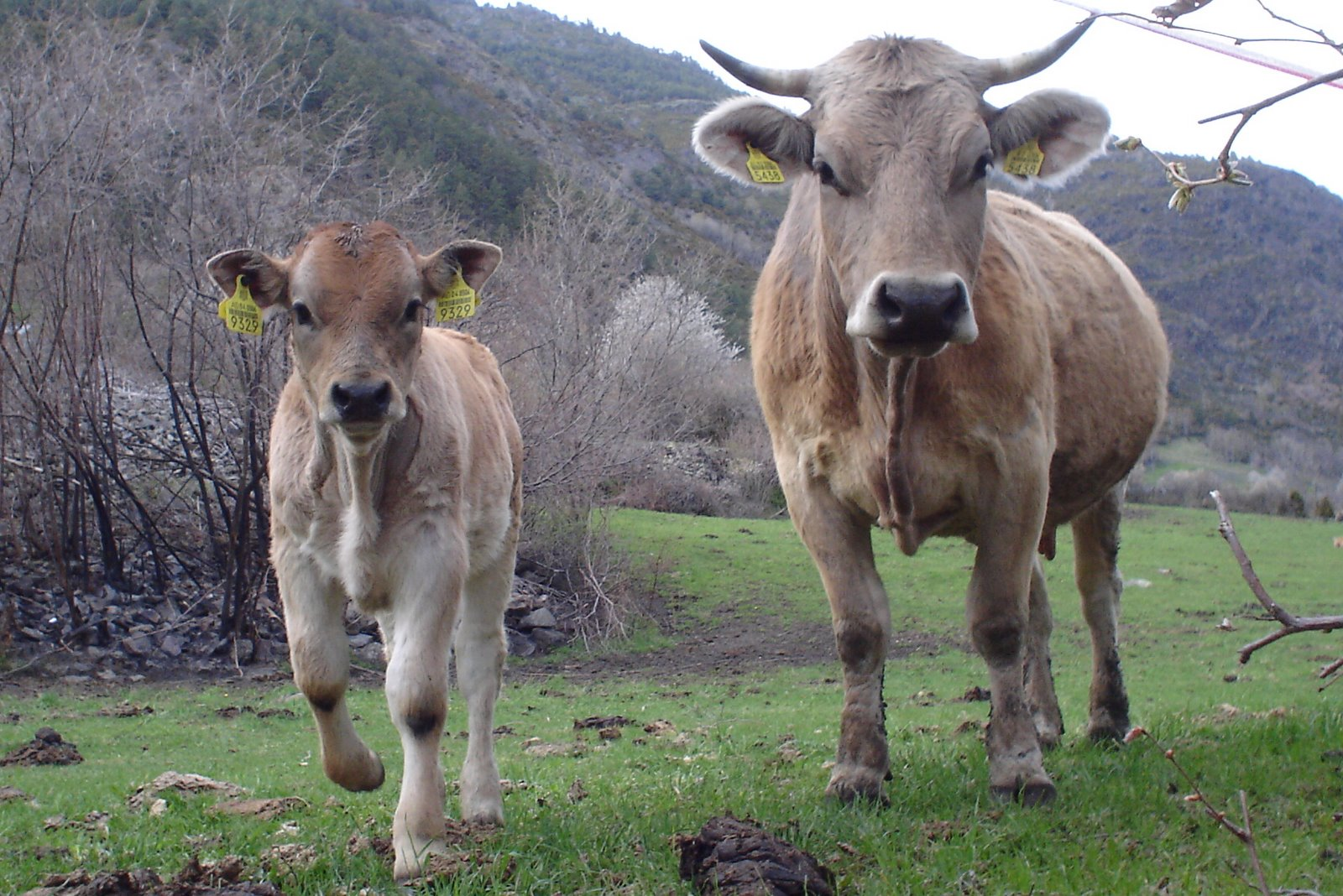
Ear tagged calf and cow in Andorra

Video of calf suckling in Bulgaria

A commercial steer or bull calf is expected to put on about 32 to 36 kg (71 to 79 lb) per month. A nine-month-old steer or bull is therefore expected to weigh about 250 to 270 kg (550 to 600 lb). Heifers will weigh at least 200 kg (440 lb) at eight months of age.

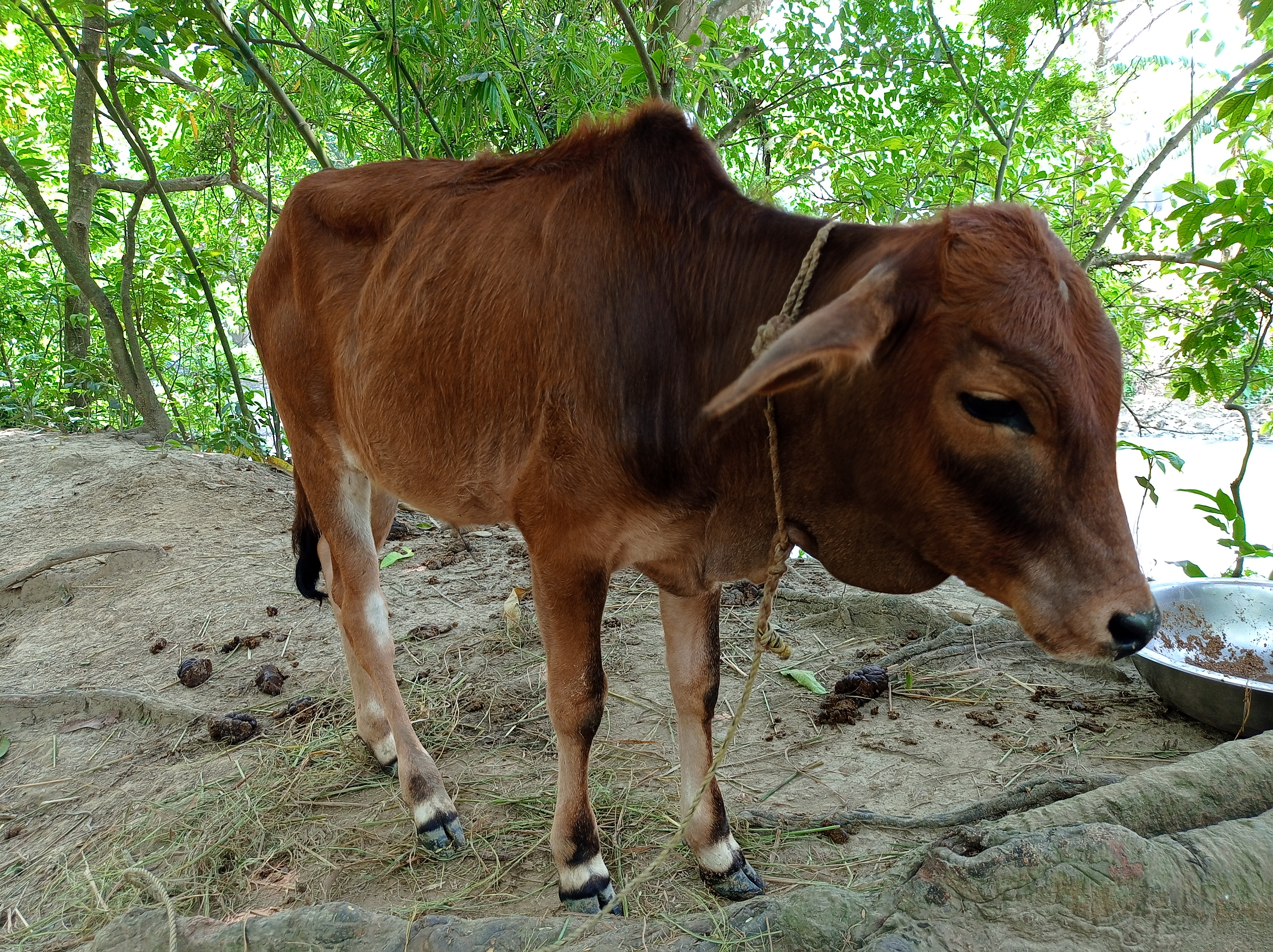
150-day-old calf

Calves are usually weaned at about eight to nine months of age, but depending on the season and condition of the dam, they might be weaned earlier. They may be paddock weaned, often next to their mothers, or weaned in stockyards. The latter system is preferred by some as it accustoms the weaners to the presence of people and they are trained to take feed other than grass. Small numbers may also be weaned with their dams with the use of weaning nose rings or nosebands which results in the mothers rejecting the calves' attempts to suckle. Many calves are also weaned when they are taken to the large weaner auction sales that are conducted in the south eastern states of Australia. Victoria and New South Wales have yardings (sale yard numbers) of up to 8,000 weaners (calves) for auction sale in one day. The best of these weaners may go to the butchers. Others will be purchased by re-stockers to grow out and fatten on grass or as potential breeders. In the United States these weaners may be known as feeders and would be placed directly into feedlots.

At about 12 months old a beef heifer reaches puberty if she is well grown.

== Uses ==
Calf meat for human consumption is called veal, and is usually produced from the male calves of dairy cattle. Also eaten are calf's brains and calf liver. The hide is used to make calfskin, or tanned into leather and called calf leather, or sometimes in the US "novillo", the Spanish term. The fourth compartment of the stomach of slaughtered milk-fed calves is the source of rennet. The intestine is used to make Goldbeater's skin, and is the source of Calf Intestinal Alkaline Phosphatase (CIP).

Dairy heifers and cows can only produce milk after having calved. Dairy cows need to produce one calf each year in order to remain in milk production. Heifer (female) calves will nearly always become a replacement dairy cow. Some dairy heifers grow up to be mothers of beef cattle. Male dairy calves are generally reared for beef or veal; relatively few are kept for use as breeding stock.

== Other animals ==
In English, the term "calf" is used by extension for the young of various other large species of mammal. In addition to other bovid species (such as bison, yak and water buffalo), these include the young of camels, dolphins, elephants, giraffes, hippopotamuses, deer (such as moose, elk (wapiti) and red deer), rhinoceroses, porpoises, whales, walruses and larger seals. Generally, the adult males of these same species are called "bulls" and the adult females "cows". However, the young of common domestic species tend to have their own specific names, such as lamb, foal used for all Equidae, or piglet used for all Suidae.

== See also ==
- Calf hutch
- Cow-calf separation

== Sources ==
- Institut de l’Élevage (2000). Maladies des bovins (in French). France Agricole. ISBN 978-2-85557-048-8.
- Dudouet, Christian (2004). La production des bovins allaitants (in French). Paris: La France Agricole. ISBN 2-85557-091-3.
