= Index of architecture articles =

This is an alphabetical index of articles related to architecture.

== 0–9 ==
- 4th millennium BC in architecture
- 30th century BC in architecture
- 29th century BC in architecture
- 27th century BC in architecture
- 26th century BC in architecture
- 25th century BC in architecture
- 21st century BC in architecture
- 19th century BC in architecture
- 18th century BC in architecture
- 14th century BC in architecture
- 13th century BC in architecture
- 6th century BC in architecture
- 5th century BC in architecture
- 2nd century in architecture
- 3rd century in architecture
- 4th century in architecture
- 5th century in architecture
- 6th century in architecture
- 7th century in architecture
- 8th century in architecture
- 9th century in architecture
- 10th century in architecture
- 11th century in architecture
- 14th century in architecture
- 16th-century Western domes
- 17th-century Western domes
- 18th-century Western domes
- 19th-century domes
- 20th-century domes
- 21st-century domes
- 1000s in architecture
- 2000 in architecture

== A ==
- A-frame building
- A-un
- Abacus
- Ab anbar
- Abat-son
- Abbasid architecture
- Ablaq
- Acanthus
- Accolade
- Achaemenid architecture
- Acropolis
- Acroterion
- Adam style
- Adaptive reuse
- Additive Architecture
- Adirondack Architecture
- Adobe
- Advanced work
- Adyton
- Aedicula
- Aeolic order
- Aerary
- Aerospace architecture
- Affordable housing by country
- Affordable housing in Canada
- Afromodernism
- Agadir
- Airey house
- Aisle
- Akbari architecture
- Albarrana tower
- Alcazaba
- Alcázar
- Alcove
- Alfarje
- Alfiz
- Alure
- Amalaka
- Ambry
- Ambulacrum
- Ambulatory
- American colonial architecture
- American Foursquare
- American Renaissance
- Ammonite order
- Amphiprostyle
- Amphitheatre
- Amsterdam School
- Anastylosis
- Anathyrosis
- Anatolian Seljuk architecture
- Anchor plate
- Ancient Chinese wooden architecture
- Ancient Egyptian architecture
- Ancient Greek and Roman roofs
- Ancient Greek architecture
- Ancient Greek temple
- Ancient Indian architecture
- Ancient monuments of Java
- Ancient Roman architecture
- Ancient Roman defensive walls
- Andalusian patio
- Andaruni
- Andean Baroque
- Andron
- Anglo-Japanese style
- Anglo-Saxon architecture
- Anglo-Saxon turriform churches
- Annulet
- Anta
- Anta capital
- Antarala
- Antae temple
- Antebellum architecture
- Antechamber
- Ante-chapel
- Ante-choir
- Antefix
- Apadana
- Apartment
- Apodyterium
- Apophyge
- Apron
- Apse
- Apse chapel
- Apsidiole
- Aqueduct
- Arabesque
- Araeostyle
- Arcachon villa
- Arcade
- Arch
- Arch bridge
- Architect
- Architects of Iran
- Architrave
- Archivolt
- Architect of record
- Architectural acoustics
- Architectural analytics
- Architectural animation
- Architectural conservation
- Architectural design competition
- Architectural design optimization
- Architectural design values
- Architectural designer
- Architectural development of the eastern end of cathedrals in England and France
- Architectural drawing
- Architectural education in the United Kingdom
- Architectural educator
- Architectural endoscopy
- Architectural engineer (PE)
- Architectural engineering
- Architectural Experience Program (AXP)
- Architectural forgery in Japan
- Architectural firm
- Architectural geometry
- Architectural glass
- Architectural Heritage Society of Scotland
- Architectural historian
- Architectural icon
- Architectural illustrator
- Architectural ironmongery
- Architectural light shelf
- Architectural lighting design
- Architectural metals
- Architectural model
- Architectural mythology
- Architectural photographers
- Architectural photography
- Architectural plan
- Architectural propaganda
- Architectural psychology in Germany
- Architectural rendering
- Architectural reprography
- Architectural Review
- Architectural school of Nakhchivan
- Architectural sculpture
- Architectural sculpture in the United States
- Architectural style
- Architectural technologist
- Architectural technology
- Architectural terracotta
- Architectural theory
- Architectural vaults
- Architecture
- Architecture for Humanity
- Architecture in early modern Scotland
- Architecture in modern Scotland
- Architecture in Omaha, Nebraska
- Architecture museum
- Architecture of Aarhus
- Architecture of Aberdeen
- Architecture of Afghanistan
- Architecture of Africa
- Architecture of Albania
- Architecture of Albany, New York
- Architecture of Algeria
- Architecture of Almaty
- Architecture of ancient Sri Lanka
- Architecture of Angola
- Architecture of Argentina
- Architecture of Atlanta
- Architecture of Australia
- Architecture of Aylesbury
- Architecture of Azerbaijan
- Architecture of Baku
- Architecture of Bangladesh
- Architecture of Barcelona
- Architecture of Bathurst, New South Wales
- Architecture of Belfast
- Architecture of Belgrade
- Architecture of Bengal
- Architecture of Berlin
- Architecture of Bermuda
- Architecture of Bhutan
- Architecture of Birmingham
- Architecture of Bolivia
- Architecture of Bosnia and Herzegovina
- Architecture of Boston
- Architecture of Brazil
- Architecture of Buffalo, New York
- Architecture of the Bulgarian Revival
- Architecture of the California missions
- Architecture of Canada
- Architecture of Cantabria
- Architecture of Cape Verde
- Architecture of Cardiff
- Architecture of Casablanca
- Architecture of cathedrals and great churches
- Architecture of Central Asia
- Architecture of Chennai
- Architecture of Chicago
- Architecture of Chile
- Architecture of Chiswick House
- Architecture of Colombia
- Architecture of Copenhagen
- Architecture of Costa Rica
- Architecture of Croatia
- Architecture of Cuba
- Architecture of the Cucuteni–Trypillia culture
- Architecture of Dakota Crescent
- Architecture of Delhi
- Architecture of Denmark
- Architecture of Dhaka
- Architecture of England
- Architecture of Estonia
- Architecture of Ethiopia
- Architecture of Fez
- Architecture of Fiji
- Architecture of Finland
- Architecture of Fredericksburg, Texas
- Architecture of Georgia
- Architecture of Germany
- Architecture of Glasgow
- Architecture of Goan Catholics
- Architecture of Gujarat
- Architecture of Hong Kong
- Architecture of Houston
- Architecture of Hungary
- Architecture of Hyderabad
- Architecture of Iceland
- Architecture of India
- Architecture of Indonesia
- Architecture of Ireland
- Architecture of Istanbul
- Architecture of Italy
- Architecture of Jacksonville
- Architecture of Jiangxi
- Architecture of Johannesburg
- Architecture of Jordan
- Architecture of Kansas City
- Architecture of Karnataka
- Architecture of Kathmandu
- Architecture of Kerala
- Architecture of Kievan Rus'
- Architecture of Kosovo
- Architecture of Kuala Lumpur
- Architecture of Kuwait
- Architecture of Lagos
- Architecture of Lahore
- Architecture of Las Vegas
- Architecture of Lebanon
- Architecture of Leeds
- Architecture of Legnica
- Architecture of Letterkenny
- Architecture of Lhasa
- Architecture of Limerick
- Architecture of Liverpool
- Architecture of London
- Architecture of the London Borough of Croydon
- Architecture of Lucknow
- Architecture of Luxembourg
- Architecture of Macau
- Architecture of Madagascar
- Architecture of Madrid
- Architecture of Maharashtra
- Architecture of Mali
- Architecture of Malta
- Architecture of Manchester
- Architecture of Mangalorean Catholics
- Architecture of the medieval cathedrals of England
- Architecture of Melbourne
- Architecture of Mesopotamia
- Architecture of metropolitan Detroit
- Architecture of Mexico
- Architecture of Monaco
- Architecture of Mongolia
- Architecture of Montenegro
- Architecture of Montreal
- Architecture of Mostar
- Architecture of Mumbai
- Architecture of the Netherlands
- Architecture of Nepal
- Architecture of New York City
- Architecture of New Zealand
- Architecture of Nigeria
- Architecture of Normandy
- Architecture of North Macedonia
- Architecture of Norway
- Architecture of Ottawa
- Architecture of Paris
- Architecture of the Paris Métro
- Architecture of Palestine
- Architecture of Peć
- Architecture of Penang
- Architecture of Peru
- Architecture of Philadelphia
- Architecture of the Philippines
- Architecture of Plymouth, Pennsylvania
- Architecture of Portland, Oregon
- Architecture of Provence
- Architecture of Puerto Rico
- Architecture of Quebec
- Architecture of Quebec City
- Architecture of Rajasthan
- Architecture of Rome
- Architecture of Samoa
- Architecture of San Antonio
- Architecture of San Francisco
- Architecture of Saudi Arabia
- Architecture of Scotland
- Architecture of Scotland in the Industrial Revolution
- Architecture of Scotland in the Middle Ages
- Architecture of Scotland in the Prehistoric era
- Architecture of Scotland in the Roman era
- Architecture of Seattle
- Architecture of Serbia
- Architecture of Singapore
- Architecture of Sri Lanka
- Architecture of the Song dynasty
- Architecture of South Korea
- Architecture of St. John's, Newfoundland and Labrador
- Architecture of St. Louis
- Architecture of Stockholm
- Architecture of Sumatra
- Architecture of Sweden
- Architecture of Switzerland
- Architecture of Sydney
- Architecture of Taiwan
- Architecture of Tamil Nadu
- Architecture of the Tarnovo Artistic School
- Architecture of Tehran
- Architecture of Telangana
- Architecture of Texas
- Architecture of Thailand
- Architecture of Tibet
- Architecture of Tokyo
- Architecture of Toronto
- Architecture of Trzebiatów
- Architecture of Turkey
- Architecture of the Netherlands
- Architecture of the Paris Métro
- Architecture of the United Arab Emirates
- Architecture of the United Kingdom
- Architecture of the United States
- Architecture of Uttar Pradesh
- Architecture of Uzbekistan
- Architecture of Vancouver
- Architecture of Vatican City
- Architecture of Veliko Tarnovo
- Architecture of Wales
- Architecture of Warsaw
- Architecture of Western Australia
- Architecture of Yugoslavia
- Architecture of Zimbabwe
- Architecture parlante
- Architecture schools in Switzerland
- Architecture studio
- Architecture terrible
- Architrave
- Archivolt
- Arcology
- Arcosolium
- Ardhamandapa
- Area
- Arena
- Armenian architecture
- Armenian church architecture
- Arris
- Arrowslit
- Art Deco
- Art Deco architecture
- Art Deco architecture of New York City
- Art Deco in Mumbai
- Art Deco in Paris
- Art Deco in the United States
- Art Deco buildings in Sydney
- Art Nouveau
- Art Nouveau architecture in Riga
- Art Nouveau architecture in Russia
- Art Nouveau in Alcoy
- Art Nouveau in Antwerp
- Art Nouveau in Strasbourg
- Art Nouveau religious buildings
- Artesonado
- Articular church
- Articulation
- Ashlar
- Assam-type architecture
- Association of German Architects
- Astragal
- Asturian architecture
- Astylar
- Atalburu
- Atlantean figures
- Atlas
- Atmosphere
- Atrium
- Attap dwelling
- Attic
- Attic base
- Attic style
- Aula regia
- Australian architectural styles
- Australian non-residential architectural styles
- Australian residential architectural styles
- Autonomous building
- Avant-garde architecture
- Avant-corps
- Awning
- Azekurazukuri
- Aztec architecture

== B ==
- Barabara
- Bachelor of Architectural Studies
- Bachelor of Architecture
- Back-to-back house
- Badami Chalukya architecture
- Bailey
- Baita
- Balairung
- Balconet
- Balconies of Cusco
- Balconies of Lima
- Balcony
- Bald arch
- Baldachin
- Baldresca
- Bale kulkul
- Bali Aga architecture
- Balinese architecture
- Balinese traditional house
- Ball flower
- Baluster
- Banjarese architecture
- Banna'i
- Banqueting house
- Banquette
- Baptistery
- Baradari
- Barbican
- Bargeboard
- Bargrennan chambered cairn
- Barndominium
- Baroque architecture
- Baroque architecture in Portugal
- Baroque Revival architecture
- Barrel roof
- Barrel vault
- Bartizan
- Baseboard
- Basement
- Basilica
- Bastide (Provençal manor)
- Bastion
- Bastion fort
- Bastle house
- Batak architecture
- Batter
- Battered corner
- Battle of the Styles
- Battlement
- Baubotanik
- Bauhaus
- Bay
- Bay-and-gable
- Bay window
- Beach house
- Bead and reel
- Beaux-Arts architecture
- Bed-mould
- Beehive house
- Belarusian Gothic
- Belfry
- Bell-cot
- Bell-gable
- Bell roof
- Bell tower
- Bell tower-porch
- Bell tower (wat)
- Belsize Architects
- Belt course
- Belvedere
- Bench table
- Bent
- Bent entrance
- Berg house
- Béton brut
- Bezantée
- Biedermeier
- Bifora
- Bildts farmhouse
- Biomimetic architecture
- Bionic architecture
- Black and white bungalow
- Black-and-white Revival architecture
- Black Forest house
- Blackhouse
- Blind arcade
- Blind arch
- Blobitecture
- Blockhouse
- Blue roof
- Bolection
- Bond beam
- Bosnian style in architecture
- Boss
- Bossage
- Bossche School
- Bouleuterion
- Bowellism
- Bowtell
- Bow window
- Box gutter
- Brabantine Gothic
- Bracket
- Brahmasthan
- Branchwork
- Brâncovenesc style
- Brattishing
- Breezeway
- Bresse house
- Bressummer
- Bretèche
- Brick Expressionism
- Brick Gothic
- Brick Gothic buildings
- Brick nog
- Brick Renaissance
- Brick Romanesque buildings
- Brickwork
- Bridge castle
- Brief
- Brise soleil
- Bristol Byzantine
- British megalith architecture
- Broach spire
- Broch
- Brutalist architecture
- Brutalist structures
- Bucranium
- Buddhist architecture
- Building
- Building code
- Building design
- Building envelope
- Building restoration
- Building typology
- Buildings and architecture of Allentown, Pennsylvania
- Buildings and architecture of Bath
- Buildings and architecture of Brighton and Hove
- Buildings and architecture of Bristol
- Buildings and architecture of New Orleans
- Buildings in Dubai
- Burdock piling
- Burgus
- Burnham Baroque
- But and ben
- Butterfly roof
- Buttress
- Byre-dwelling
- Byzantine architecture
- Byzantine Revival architecture

== C ==
- Caisson
- Caldarium
- Calendar house
- California bungalow
- Camarín
- Camber beam
- Cambridge School of Architecture and Landscape Architecture
- Canada's grand railway hotels
- Canadian Centre for Architecture
- Candi bentar
- Candi of Indonesia
- Canopy
- Cant
- Cantilever
- Cantoris
- Cape Dutch architecture
- Capilla abierta
- Capital
- Caravanserai
- Carolingian architecture
- Carpenter Gothic
- Carport
- Cartilage Baroque
- Cartouche
- Caryatid
- Casa montañesa
- Cascina a corte
- Cas di torto
- Casemate
- Casement stay
- Casement window
- Castellum
- Cast-iron architecture
- Castle
- Castle chapel
- Cast stone
- Catalan Gothic
- Catalan Romanesque Churches of the Vall de Boí
- Catalan vault
- Catenary arch
- Cathedral
- Cathedral arch
- Cathedral Architect
- Cathedral floorplan
- Cathedrals in Spain
- Catshead (architecture)
- Cavaedium
- Cavalier
- Cave castle
- Cavea
- Cavetto
- Cavity wall
- Ceiling
- Cella
- Cell church
- Cenotaph
- Central-passage house
- Centring
- Ceramic house
- Chahartaq
- Chalet
- Chamber gate
- Chamber tomb
- Chambered cairn
- Chambranle
- Chamfer
- Chancel
- Channel letters
- Chantlate
- Chapel
- Chapter house
- Chardak
- Charleston single house
- Charrette
- Chartaque
- Charter bole
- Chartered architect
- Château
- Châteauesque
- Chattel house
- Chemin de ronde
- Chemise
- Cherokee Gothic
- Chhajja
- Chhatri
- Chicago school
- Chigi
- Chilotan architecture
- Chimney
- Chimney breast
- Chinese architecture
- Chinese Chippendale
- Chinese Islamic architecture
- Chinese pagoda
- Chinese temple architecture
- Choga
- Choir
- Chola art and architecture
- Church architecture
- Church architecture in England
- Church architecture in Scotland
- Church window
- Churches in Norway
- Churches of Chiloé
- Churrigueresque
- Ciborium
- Circulation
- Circus
- Cistercian architecture
- Citadel
- City Beautiful movement
- City block
- City gate
- City of Vicenza and the Palladian Villas of the Veneto
- Clapboard
- Classical architecture
- Classical order
- Clerestory
- Clerk of works
- Cliff dwelling
- Clock gable
- Cloister
- Cloister vault
- Coade stone
- Cobblestone architecture
- Coenaculum
- Coercion castle
- Coffer
- Collegiate Gothic
- Colonette
- Colonial architecture
- Colonial architecture in Jakarta
- Colonial architecture in Padang
- Colonial architecture in Surabaya
- Colonial architecture of Indonesia
- Colonial architecture of Makassar
- Colonial architecture of Southeast Asia
- Colonial Revival architecture
- Colonnade
- Column
- Comacine masters
- Combination stair
- Compass
- Compound pier
- Compression member
- Computer-aided architectural design
- Comtois steeple
- Concatenation
- Concentric castle
- Conceptual architecture
- Conch house
- Concrete landscape curbing
- Concrete shell
- Congrès Internationaux d'Architecture Moderne
- Conical roof
- Conisterium
- Connected farm
- Construction partnering
- Constructivist architecture
- Consumption wall
- Contemporary architecture
- Contextual architecture
- Conversation pit
- Coping
- Copper cladding
- Copper in architecture
- Coptic architecture
- Copyright in architecture in the United States
- Corbel
- Corbel arch
- Cordonata
- Core
- Corinthian order
- Cornerstone
- Corner tower
- Cornice
- Coron
- Corps de logis
- Cosmatesque
- Cotswold architecture
- Cottage flat
- Cottage orné
- Cottage window
- Council architect
- Council on Tall Buildings and Urban Habitat
- Counter-arch
- Coupled column
- Court of honor (Cour d'honneur)
- Course
- Court cairn
- Courtyard house
- Cove lighting
- Coved ceiling
- Covertway
- Crannog
- Creole architecture in the United States
- Crepidoma
- Crescent
- Cresting
- Crimson Architectural Historians
- Crinkle crankle wall
- Critical regionalism
- Croatian pre-Romanesque art and architecture
- Crocket
- Crooked spire
- Cross-in-square
- Cross-wall
- Cross-window
- Cross-wing
- Crossing
- Crowdsourcing architecture
- Crown molding
- Crown steeple
- Crownwork
- Cruciform
- Crypt
- Cryptoporticus
- Cubiculum
- Curtain wall
- Cyclopean masonry
- Cyclostyle
- Cymatium
- Cyzicene hall
- Czech architecture
- Czech Baroque architecture
- Czech Cubism
- Czech Gothic architecture
- Czech Renaissance architecture

== D ==
- Dado
- Dado rail
- Daibutsuyō
- Dakkah
- Danish design
- Darbazi
- Dargah
- Dartmoor longhouse
- Deck
- Deconstruction
- Deconstructivism
- Decorated Gothic
- Deep foundation
- Deep Jyoti Stambh
- Deep plan
- Defensive wall
- Defensive towers of Cantabria
- Demerara window
- Dentil
- Destruction of country houses in 20th-century Britain
- Detinets
- Diagrid
- Diamond vault
- Diapering
- Diaphragm arch
- Diaulos
- Digital architecture
- Dikka
- Diocletian window
- Discharging arch
- Disordered piling
- Dissenting Gothic
- Distyle
- Distyle in antis
- Dō
- Doctor of Architecture
- Dog-tooth
- Dome
- Domus
- Doric order
- Dormer
- Double chapel
- Double-skin facade
- Dougong
- Dragestil
- Dravidian architecture
- Drawing board
- Dropped ceiling
- Drum tower
- Dry stone
- Dun (fortification)
- Duomo
- Duplex (building)
- Dutch architecture in Semarang
- Dutch Baroque architecture
- Dutch brick
- Dutch Colonial architecture
- Dutch Colonial Revival architecture
- Dutch door
- Dutch gable
- Dwarf gallery
- Dzong architecture

== E ==
- Early and simple domes
- Early Christian art and architecture
- Early English Gothic
- Early medieval domes
- Early New York Architecture in 19th Century
- Early skyscrapers
- Earthquake Baroque
- East Asian hip-and-gable roof
- Easter Sepulchre
- Eastern Orthodox church architecture
- Eastlake movement
- Eave return
- Eaves
- Eclecticism in architecture
- Edwardian architecture
- Edwardian Baroque architecture
- Egg-and-dart
- Egyptian pyramids
- Egyptian pyramid construction techniques
- Egyptian Revival architecture
- Egyptian Revival architecture in the British Isles
- Elevated entrance
- Elizabethan architecture
- Elizabethan Baroque
- Ell
- Ellipsoidal dome
- Elliptical dome
- Embrasure
- Emissary
- Empire style
- Enceinte
- Enclosure castle
- Enfilade
- Engaged column
- Engawa
- English Baroque
- English country house
- English Gothic architecture
- English vernacular architecture
- Entablature
- Entasis
- Ergastulum
- Estate houses in Scotland
- Estipite
- Estonian vernacular architecture
- Etruscan architecture
- European medieval architecture in North America
- European Route of Brick Gothic
- European Union Prize for Contemporary Architecture
- Euthynteria
- Examination for Architects in Canada
- Exedra
- Experimental architecture
- Expression
- Expressionist architecture

== F ==
- Fabric structure
- Facade
- Facadism
- False door
- Falsework
- Familok
- Fanlight
- Fan vault
- Fantastic architecture
- Farmhouse
- Fascia
- Fascist architecture
- Fatimid architecture
- Fatimid Great Palaces
- Fauces
- Faussebraye
- Federal architecture
- Federal modernism
- Federation architecture
- Fender pier
- Ferro
- Festoon
- Fina
- Finial
- Firebox
- Fire door
- Fire lookout tower
- Firewall
- First national architectural movement
- First Period architecture
- First Romanesque
- Flak tower
- Flamboyant
- Flame palmette
- Flanking tower
- Flat roof
- Flèche (architecture)
- Flèche (fortification)
- Flèche faîtière
- Fleuron
- Float glass
- Floating floor
- Flood arch
- Floor medallion
- Floor plan
- Floor vibration
- Florida cracker architecture
- Florida modern
- Flushwork
- Fluting (architecture)
- Flying arch
- Flying buttress
- Foil
- Folk Victorian
- Folly
- Folly fort
- Forced perspective
- Forecourt
- Form follows function
- Fortification
- Fortified gateway
- Fortified house
- Fortified tower
- Fortochka
- Fortress church
- Fortress synagogue
- Forum
- Foundation
- Four-centred arch
- Frederician Rococo
- Free plan
- French architecture
- French Baroque architecture
- French Colonial
- French Gothic architecture
- French Renaissance architecture
- French Restoration style
- French Romanesque architecture
- Frëngji
- Fretwork
- Frieze
- Frigidarium
- Frisian farmhouse
- Frontispiece
- Fumarium
- Funco
- Functionalism
- Fusuma

== G ==
- Gabion
- Gable
- Gablefront house
- Gable roof
- Gablet roof
- Gable stone
- Gaiola
- Galilee
- Gallery
- Galleting
- Gambrel
- Gaper
- Garbhagriha
- Garderobe
- Gargoyle
- Garland bearers
- Garret
- Garrison
- Gatehouse
- Gate tower
- Gavaksha
- Gavit
- Gazebo
- Geestharden house
- Geison
- Genius loci
- Geodesic dome
- Georgian architecture
- Gibbs surround
- Gingerbread
- Girih
- Girih tiles
- Girt
- Giyōfū architecture
- Glass brick
- Glass floor
- Glass in green buildings
- Glass mosaic
- Glass mullion system
- Glass tile
- Glazed architectural terra-cotta
- Glazing
- Gloriette
- Gold leaf
- Gonbad
- Gongbei
- Gothic architecture
- Gothic architecture in Lithuania
- Gothic architecture in modern Poland
- Gothic brick buildings in Germany
- Gothic brick buildings in the Netherlands
- Gothic buildings
- Gothic cathedrals and churches
- Gothic Revival architecture
- Gothic Revival architecture in Canada
- Gothic Revival architecture in Poland
- Gothic Revival buildings
- Gothic secular and domestic architecture
- Goût grec
- Grade beam
- Graecostasis
- Granary
- Grands Projets of François Mitterrand
- Great chamber
- Great hall
- Great house
- Great Rebuilding
- Great room
- Great Seljuk architecture
- Greek Baths
- Greek Revival architecture
- Green building
- Gridshell
- Grille (architecture)
- Grillwork
- Groin vault
- Grotesque
- Grotto
- Gründerzeit
- Guard stone
- Guard tower
- Guastavino tile
- Guerrilla architecture
- Gulf house
- Gutta
- Gymnasium
- Gynaeceum

== H ==
- Hachiman-zukuri
- Hagioscope
- Haiden
- Hakka walled village
- Half tower
- Hall
- Hall and parlor house
- Hall church
- Hall house
- Hammerbeam roof
- Han dynasty tomb architecture
- Hanover school of architecture
- Harappan architecture
- Harling
- Hasht-behesht
- Hashti
- Haubarg
- Hausa architecture
- Hawaiian architecture
- Hay hood
- Heiden
- Heimatschutz
- Heliopolis style
- Heliotrope
- Hemadpanti architecture
- Henry II style
- Henry IV style
- Heritage houses in Sydney
- Heritage structures in Chennai
- Herma
- Herodian architecture
- Heroon
- Herrerian style
- Herzog & de Meuron
- Hexafoil
- Hexagonal window
- Hidden roof
- High medieval domes
- High-rise building
- High-tech architecture
- High Victorian Gothic
- Hill castle
- Hillfort
- Hillforts in Scotland
- Hillside castle
- Hilltop castle
- Hindu and Buddhist architectural heritage of Pakistan
- Hindu architecture
- Hindu temple architecture
- Hip roof
- Hippodrome
- Hirairi
- Hisashi
- Historic house
- Historicism
- History of architectural engineering
- History of architecture
- History of the world's tallest buildings
- History of urban planning
- Hiyoshi-zukuri
- Hoarding
- Hogan
- Hokkien architecture
- Hokora
- Honden
- Hood mould
- Hórreo
- Horreum
- Horseshoe arch
- Hosh
- Hostile architecture
- Hôtel particulier
- House
- Housebarn
- House-commune
- House plan
- Housing in Azerbaijan
- Housing in China
- Housing in Europe
- Housing in Glasgow
- Housing in Hong Kong
- Housing in India
- Housing in Japan
- Housing in New Zealand
- Housing in Pakistan
- Housing in Portugal
- Housing in Scotland
- Housing in Senegal
- Housing in the United Kingdom
- Howz
- Hoysala architecture
- Huabiao
- Hui-style architecture
- Hunky punk
- Hypaethral
- Hyphen
- Hypocaust
- Hypostyle
- Hypotrachelium

== I ==
- I-house
- Iberian pre-Romanesque art and architecture
- Ice house
- Icelandic turf house
- Iconostasis
- Ideal town
- Illusionistic ceiling painting
- Imbrex and tegula
- Imperial castle
- Imperial Crown Style
- Imperial roof decoration
- Imperial staircase
- Impluvium
- Impluvium (house)
- Impost
- Inca architecture
- Indented corners
- Indian rock-cut architecture
- Indian vernacular architecture
- Indies Empire style
- Indigenous architecture
- Indo-Corinthian capital
- Indo-Islamic architecture
- Indo-Saracenic architecture
- Industrial architecture
- Infill wall
- Inglenook
- Insula (building)
- Insula (Roman city)
- Interactive architecture
- Intercolumniation
- Interior architecture
- Intern architect
- Intern Architect Program
- International Gothic
- International Style
- International Union of Architects
- Interstitial space
- Inverted arch
- Inverted bell
- Inverted pyramid
- Ionic order
- Ipswich window
- Iranian architecture
- Irish round tower
- Iron railing
- Irori
- Isabelline
- Isfahani style
- Ishi-no-ma-zukuri
- Islamic architecture
- Islamic geometric patterns
- Island castle
- Italian Baroque architecture
- Italian Gothic architecture
- Italian modern and contemporary architecture
- Italian Neoclassical architecture
- Italian Renaissance domes
- Italianate architecture
- Iwan
- Izba

== J ==
- Jacal
- Jack arch
- Jacobean architecture
- Jagati
- Jali
- Jamaican Georgian architecture
- Jama masjid
- Jamb
- Jamb statue
- Japan Institute of Architects
- Japanese architecture
- Japanese Buddhist architecture
- Japanese pagoda
- Japanese wall
- Japanese-Western Eclectic Architecture
- Javanese traditional house
- Jeffersonian architecture
- Jengki style
- Jesmonite
- Jettying
- Jewish architecture
- Jharokha
- Joglo
- Jugendstil
- Jutaku

== K ==
- Kadamba architecture
- Kagura-den
- Kairō
- Kalae house
- Kalang house
- Kalinga architecture
- Kalybe (temple)
- Karahafu
- Karamon
- Kasbah
- Kasuga-zukuri
- Kath kuni architecture
- Katōmado
- Katsuogi
- Keep
- Keystone
- Khmer architecture
- Khorasani style
- Khrushchyovka
- Kibitsu-zukuri
- Kinetic architecture
- King post
- Kit house
- Kiva
- Kliros
- Knee
- Knee wall
- Knotted column
- Koil
- Kokoshnik architecture
- Komainu
- Konak
- Korean architecture
- Korean pagoda
- Kraton
- Kremlin
- Kucheh
- Kura
- Kuruwa
- Kyōzō

== L ==
- L-plan castle
- Labrum
- Laconicum
- Lally column
- Lamolithic house
- Lanai
- Lancet window
- Landhuis
- Landscape architect
- Landscript
- Lantern tower
- Late medieval domes
- Latina
- Lattice tower
- Latticework
- Lesene
- Leuit
- Levantine Gothic
- Liberty style
- Library stack
- Lierne
- Lightwell
- Lime plaster
- Limes
- Linenfold
- Lingnan architecture
- Linhay
- Linked house
- Lintel
- Listed building
- Liwan
- Lobby
- Loculus
- Log building
- Log cabin
- Log house
- Loggia
- Lombard architecture
- Lombard band
- London Festival of Architecture
- Long barrow
- Long gallery
- Longhouse
- Longhouses of the indigenous peoples of North America
- Lookout
- Lopo house
- Lorraine house
- Louis period styles
- Louis XIII style
- Louis XIV style
- Louis XV style
- Louis XVI style
- Louis Philippe style
- Louver
- Low-energy house
- Low German house
- Lowland castle
- Low-rise building
- Lublin Renaissance
- Lucarne
- Lunette
- Lunette (fortification)
- Luten arch

== M ==
- Maashaus
- Machiya
- Machicolation
- Maenianum
- Mahal
- Mahoney tables
- Main Hall
- Major town houses of the architect Victor Horta (Brussels)
- Malay house
- Maltese Baroque architecture
- Mamluk architecture
- Mammisi
- Mandaloun
- Mandapa
- Mannerism
- Mannerist architecture and sculpture in Poland
- Manor house
- Mansard roof
- Mansion
- Mansionization
- Manueline
- Manufactured housing
- Maqam
- Maqsurah
- Mar del Plata style
- Margent
- Marine architecture
- Marriage stone
- Marsh castle
- Martello tower
- Martyrium
- Māru-Gurjara architecture
- Mas (Provençal farmhouse)
- Mascaron
- Mashrabiya
- Masia
- Massing
- Mastaba
- Master of Architecture
- Materiality
- Mathematical tile
- Mathematics and architecture
- Mathura lion capital
- Matroneum
- Mausoleum
- Maya architecture
- Mayan Revival architecture
- Mead hall
- Meander
- Medallion
- Medici villas
- Medieval architecture
- Medieval fortification
- Medieval Serbian architecture
- Medieval stained glass
- Medieval turf building in Cronberry
- Mediterranean Revival architecture
- Megalithic architectural elements
- Megaron
- Megastructure
- Meitei architecture
- Membrane structure
- Memorial gates and arches
- Mendicant monasteries in Mexico
- Merlon
- Merovingian art and architecture
- Meru tower
- Mesoamerican architecture
- Mesoamerican ballcourt
- Mesoamerican pyramids
- Metabolism
- Metaphoric architecture
- Metope
- Metroon
- Mezzanine
- Miami Modern architecture
- Microdistrict
- Mid-century modern
- Middle German house
- Mihashira Torii
- Mihrab
- Minaret
- Minimal Traditional
- Minka
- Minstrels' gallery
- Mission Revival architecture
- Mithraeum
- Model maker
- Modern architecture
- Modern architecture in Athens
- Modern Greek architecture
- Moderne architecture
- Modernisme
- Modillion
- Modular building
- Mokoshi
- Moldavian style
- Molding
- Mole
- Mon
- Monaco villas
- Mondop
- Monitor
- Monofora
- Monolithic architecture
- Monolithic church
- Monolithic column
- Monolithic dome
- Mono-pitched roof
- Monopteros
- Monterey Colonial architecture
- Monumental sculpture
- Monumentalism
- Moon gate
- Moorish architecture
- Moorish Revival architecture
- Moorish Revival architecture in Bosnia and Herzegovina
- Morava architectural school
- Moroccan architecture
- Moroccan riad
- Moroccan style
- Morphology
- Mosaic
- Mosque
- Motte-and-bailey castle
- Motte-and-bailey castles
- Mozarabic art and architecture
- Mudéjar
- Mudéjar architecture of Aragon
- Mughal architecture
- Muisca architecture
- Mullion
- Mullion wall
- Multi-family residential
- Multifoil arch
- Muntin
- Muqarnas
- Muragala
- Murder hole
- Musalla
- Museum architecture
- Musgum mud huts
- Myanmar architecture
- Mycenaean Revival architecture

== N ==
- Nabataean architecture
- Nagare-zukuri
- Naiskos
- Nakazonae
- Namako wall
- Nano House
- Napoleon III style
- Naqqar khana
- Narthex
- Naryshkin Baroque
- National Aptitude Test in Architecture
- National Park Service rustic
- National Romantic style
- Natural building
- Nave
- Nazi architecture
- Neck ditch
- Neo-Andean
- Neo-Byzantine architecture in the Russian Empire
- Neo-eclectic architecture
- Neo-futurism
- Neo-Grec
- Neo-historism
- Neo-Manueline
- Neomodern
- Neo-Mudéjar
- Neo-Tiwanakan architecture
- Neoclásico Isabelino
- Neoclassical architecture
- Neoclassical architecture in Belgium
- Neoclassical architecture in Milan
- Neoclassical architecture in Poland
- Neoclassical architecture in Russia
- Neoclassicism in France
- Neolithic architecture
- Neolithic long house
- Neorion
- New Classical architecture
- New Formalism (architecture)
- New Hague School
- New Indies Style
- New Khmer Architecture
- New Mexico vernacular
- New Objectivity
- New Spanish Baroque
- New Urbanism
- Newa architecture
- Newar window
- Newel
- Niche
- Nieuwe Zakelijkheid
- Nightingale floor
- Nijūmon
- Nilachal architecture
- Niōmon
- Nipa hut
- Nocturnal architecture
- Nonbuilding structure types
- Non-Referential Architecture
- Nordic Classicism
- Nordic megalith architecture
- Norman architecture
- Norman architecture in Cheshire
- Norman Revival architecture
- North light
- North-Western Italian architecture
- Novelty architecture
- Nubian architecture
- Nubian vault
- Nuraghe
- Nymphaeum

== O ==
- Ōbaku Zen architecture
- Obelisk
- Observation deck
- Observation tower
- Octagon house
- Octagon on cube
- Oculus
- Odeon
- Oecus
- Oeil-de-boeuf
- Ogee
- Ogive
- Okinawan architecture
- Old Frisian farmhouse
- Old Frisian longhouse
- Oldest buildings in Scotland
- One-day votive churches
- Onigawara
- Onion dome
- Open building
- Open plan
- Openwork
- Opisthodomos
- Opus
- Opus africanum
- Opus albarium
- Opus compositum
- Opus craticum
- Opus emplectum
- Opus gallicum
- Opus incertum
- Opus isodomum
- Opus latericium
- Opus listatum
- Opus mixtum
- Opus quadratum
- Opus regulatum
- Opus reticulatum
- Opus sectile
- Opus signinum
- Opus spicatum
- Opus tessellatum
- Opus testaceum
- Opus vermiculatum
- Opus vittatum
- Orangery
- Order
- Organic architecture
- Oriel window
- Origins and architecture of the Taj Mahal
- Orillon
- Ornamentalism
- Orri
- Orthostates
- Ottoman architecture
- Ottoman architecture in Egypt
- Overhang
- Overlay architecture
- Ovolo

== P ==
- Padmasana
- Paduraksa
- Pagoda
- Pair-house
- Pakistani architecture
- Palace
- Palaestra
- Palas
- Palazzo
- Palazzo style architecture
- Palisade church
- Palladian architecture
- Palladio Award
- Pallava art and architecture
- Palloza
- Palmette
- Pandyan art and architecture
- Paned window
- Panelák
- Panelling
- Panjdari
- Parabolic arch
- Paraguayan architecture
- Parametricism
- Parapet
- Parclose screen
- Pargeting
- Paris architecture of the Belle Époque
- Parlour
- Parthenon
- Parthian style
- Parti pris
- Party wall
- Parvise
- Pataliputra capital
- Patera
- Patina
- Patio
- Patio home
- Pattern
- Pattern book
- Pattern language
- Paulista School
- Pavement
- Pavilion
- Pavilion (exhibition)
- Peak ornament
- Pedestal
- Pediment
- Pedimental sculpture
- Pedway
- Peel tower
- Pelmet
- Pend
- Pendant vault
- Pendentive
- Pendhapa
- Perpendicular Gothic
- Performative architecture
- Pergola
- Peribolos
- Peripteros
- Peristasis
- Peristyle
- Perpend stone
- Perron
- Perserschutt
- Persian column
- Peruvian colonial architecture
- Petrine Baroque
- Phallic architecture
- Phenomenology
- Phiale
- Philosophy of architecture
- Piano nobile
- Pier
- Pierrotage
- Pieve
- Pila
- Pilae stacks
- Pilaster
- Piloti
- Pinnacle
- Pit-house
- Place-of-arms
- Plafond
- Plan
- Plank house
- Plantagenet style
- Plateresque
- Plattenbau
- Plot plan
- Pluteus
- Plyscraper
- Podium
- Pointed arch
- Polifora
- Polish Cathedral style
- Polished plaster
- Polite architecture
- Polychrome
- Polychrome brickwork
- Polygonal fort
- Polygonal masonry
- Pombaline style
- Ponce Creole
- Pont Street Dutch
- Porch
- Portal
- Portcullis
- Porte-cochère
- Portego
- Portico
- Porticus
- Porto School of Architecture
- Portuguese Architecture
- Portuguese colonial architecture
- Portuguese Gothic architecture
- Portuguese Romanesque architecture
- Post
- Post and lintel
- Post-and-plank
- Post church
- Post in ground
- Postconstructivism
- Postern
- Postmodern architecture
- Poteaux-sur-sol
- Poupou
- Prairie School
- Pranala
- Prang
- Prasat
- Prastara
- Prefabricated building
- Prefabricated home
- Prefabs in the United Kingdom
- Prehistoric pile dwellings around the Alps
- Pre-Parsian style
- Pre-Romanesque art and architecture
- Pre-war architecture
- Primitive Hut
- Pritzker Architecture Prize
- Prodigy house
- Professional requirements for architects
- Project architect
- Promenade architecturale
- Promontory fort
- Proportion
- Propylaea
- Prospect 100 best modern Scottish buildings
- Prostyle
- Prow house
- Prytaneion
- Pseudodipteral
- Pseudoperipteros
- Pteron
- Pucca housing
- Pueblo Deco architecture
- Pueblo Revival architecture
- Pullman
- Pulpitum
- Pulvino
- Purism
- Purlin
- Puteal
- Putlog hole
- Puuc
- PWA Moderne
- Pyatthat
- Pylon
- Pyramidion

== Q ==
- Qa'a
- Qadad
- Qal'a
- Quadrangle
- Quadrangular castle
- Quadrant
- Quadrifora
- Quarry-faced stone
- Quarter round
- Quatrefoil
- Quattrocento
- Queen Anne Revival architecture in the United Kingdom
- Queen Anne style architecture
- Queen Anne style architecture in the United States
- Queenslander
- Quincha
- Quoin
- Qutb Shahi architecture

== R ==
- Rafter
- Raised floor
- Rampart
- Ranch-style house
- Rangkiang
- Raška architectural school
- Ratha
- Rationalism
- Raygun Gothic
- Rayonnant
- Realism
- Reconstruction
- Redoubt
- Reduit
- Reeding
- Reflecting pool
- Refuge castle
- Regency architecture
- Regia
- Regional characteristics of Romanesque churches
- Reglet
- Regulating Lines
- Reinforced concrete column
- Relief
- Religious architecture in Belgrade
- Religious architecture in Novi Sad
- Renaissance architecture
- Renaissance Revival architecture
- Repoblación art and architecture
- Residence
- Residential architecture in Historic Cairo
- Residential architecture in Ibiza
- Residential architecture in Poland
- Resort architecture
- Respond
- Responsive architecture
- Retaining wall
- Retractable roof
- Retrofuturism
- Retroquire
- Rhenish helm
- Revenue house
- Revivalism
- Revolving door
- RIBA Competitions
- RIBA Journal
- Ribat
- Rib vault
- Richardsonian Romanesque
- Ridge castle
- Ridge-post framing
- Ridge turret
- Rim joist
- Rinceau
- Ringfort
- Riwaq
- Rocca
- Rock castle
- Rock-cut architecture
- Rock-cut architecture of Cappadocia
- Rococo architecture in Portugal
- Rococo in Spain
- Roman amphitheatre
- Roman aqueduct
- Roman architectural revolution
- Roman brick
- Roman bridge
- Roman canal
- Roman cistern
- Roman concrete
- Roman dams and reservoirs
- Roman domes
- Roman shower
- Roman temple
- Roman theatre
- Roman villa
- Romanesque architecture
- Romanesque architecture in Poland
- Romanesque architecture in Sardinia
- Romanesque architecture in Spain
- Romanesque buildings
- Romanesque churches in Madrid
- Romanesque Revival architecture in the United Kingdom
- Romanesque secular and domestic architecture
- Romanian architecture
- Romano-Gothic
- Rōmon
- Rondavel
- Rondocubism
- Roof comb
- Roof garden
- Roof lantern
- Roofline
- Roof pitch
- Roof window
- Rood screen
- Room
- Rorbu
- Rosette
- Rose window
- Roshandan
- Rostra
- Rostral column
- Rota
- Rotunda
- Round barn
- Roundel
- Roundhouse
- Round-tower church
- Royal Gold Medal
- Royal Institute of British Architects
- Ruin value
- Ruins
- Rumah Gadang
- Rumah limas
- Rumah ulu
- Rumoh Aceh
- Rundbogenstil
- Russian architecture
- Russian church architecture
- Russian cultural heritage register
- Russian neoclassical revival
- Russian Revival architecture
- Rustication

== S ==
- Sacellum
- Sacral architecture
- Saddle roof
- Saddleback roof
- Sahn
- Sail shade
- Saka guru
- Sakuji-bugyō
- Sala
- Sally port
- Saltbox house
- Sand Hills cottage architecture
- Sandō
- Sanmon
- Sarasota School of Architecture
- Sarnath capital
- Sasak architecture
- Sasanian architecture
- Sash window
- Scaenae frons
- Scagliola
- Scamilli impares
- Scarsella
- Schinkel school
- Scissors truss
- Sconce
- Scottish baronial architecture
- Scottish castles
- Scottish Vernacular
- Screened porch
- Scroll
- Seattle box
- Sebil
- Second Empire architecture in Europe
- Second Empire architecture in the United States and Canada
- Secondary suite
- Secret passage
- Secular building
- Sedilia
- Segmental arch
- Self-cleaning floor
- Self-cleaning glass
- Semi-basement
- Semi-detached
- Semi-dome
- Serbian wooden churches
- Serbo-Byzantine architecture
- Serbo-Byzantine Revival
- Serpentine shape
- Setback
- Setchūyō
- Set-off
- Sexpartite vault
- Shabaka
- Shabestan
- Shah Jahan period architecture
- Shallow foundation
- Shanxi architecture
- Shear wall
- Shed style
- Shell keep
- Shibi
- Shinbashira
- Shinden-zukuri
- Shingle style architecture
- Shinmei-zukuri
- Shinto architecture
- Shinto shrine
- Shipping container architecture
- Shipping container clinic
- Shitomi
- Shoebox style
- Shoin-zukuri
- Shōji
- Shophouse
- Shōrō
- Shotgun house
- Siberian Baroque
- Sicilian Baroque
- Side-deck
- Side passage plan architecture
- Sikh architecture
- Silesian architecture
- Sill plate
- Sima
- Single- and double-pen architecture
- Single-family detached home
- Sino-Portuguese architecture
- Site plan
- Site-specific architecture
- Skylight
- Skyscraper Index
- Skyway
- Slab hut
- Sleeping porch
- Slenderness ratio
- Slipcover
- Sliver building
- Slow architecture
- Smoke hole
- Snout house
- Sobrado
- Sociology of architecture
- Socle
- Soffit
- Soft Portuguese style
- Solar
- Solar architecture
- Solar chimney
- Solarized architectural glass
- Solomonic column
- Somali architecture
- Sōmon
- Sondergotik
- Sopo
- Sōrin
- Sotoportego
- South Asian domes
- Southern Colonial style in California
- Southern French Gothic
- Spa architecture
- Space
- Space architecture
- Spatiality
- Spandrel
- Spanish architecture
- Spanish Baroque architecture
- Spanish Colonial architecture
- Spanish Colonial Revival architecture
- Spanish Gothic architecture
- Spanish Romanesque
- Sphaeristerium
- Spire
- Spire light
- Spite house
- Split-level home
- Springer
- Spolia
- Spur
- Spur castle
- Squinch
- Stabilization
- Staddle stones
- Stained glass
- Stair riser
- Staircase tower
- Stalinist architecture
- Stanchion
- Starchitect
- State architect
- State room
- Stavanger Renaissance
- Stave church
- Steeple
- Step pyramid
- Stepwell
- Stepped gable
- Stick style
- Stile Umbertino
- Stillicidium
- Still room
- Stilt house
- Stilt tower
- Stilts
- Stoa
- Stone ender
- Stoop
- Storybook house
- Strap footing
- Strapwork
- Streamline Moderne
- Stripped Classicism
- Structuralism
- Structures built by animals
- Studio apartment
- Stupa
- Style Sapin
- Stylobate
- Sudatorium
- Sundanese traditional house
- Sudano-Sahelian architecture
- Sukanasa
- Sukiya-zukuri
- Sumbanese traditional house
- Summer architecture
- Sumiyoshi-zukuri
- Sunburst
- Sunken courtyard
- Sunroom
- Suntop Homes
- Superposed order
- Suprematism
- Surau
- Suspensura
- Sustainable architecture
- Svan towers
- Swahili architecture
- Świdermajer
- Swiss Chalet Revival architecture
- Swiss chalet style
- Symbolism of domes
- Synagogue architecture

== T ==
- Taberna
- Tablinum
- Tadelakt
- Taenia
- Tahōtō
- Taisha-zukuri
- Tajug
- Talud-tablero
- Tambo
- Tambour
- Tas-de-charge
- Tatar mosque
- Technical drawing
- Teito
- Telamon
- Temazcal
- Temple
- Templon
- Tenaille
- Tenement
- Tenshu
- Tensile structure
- Tension member
- Teocalli
- Tepidarium
- Term
- Terrace
- Terraced house
- Terraced houses in Australia
- Terraced houses in the United Kingdom
- Terreplein
- Territorial Style
- Territorial Revival architecture
- Tessellated roof
- Tetraconch
- Tetrapylon
- Thai temple art and architecture
- The 20th-Century Architecture of Frank Lloyd Wright
- Thin-shell structure
- Tholobate
- Tholos
- Three hares
- Tibetan Buddhist architecture
- Tidewater architecture
- Tie
- Tiltyard
- Timber framing
- Timber roof truss
- Timeline of architectural styles
- Timeline of architectural styles 1750–1900
- Timeline of Art Nouveau
- Timeline of Italian architecture
- Tin ceiling
- Tiny house movement
- Tokyō
- Toll castle
- Tongkonan
- Tong lau
- Tulou
- Torana
- Torii
- Torp
- Totalitarian architecture
- Tourelle
- Tower
- Tower blocks in Great Britain
- Tower castle
- Tower house
- Tower houses in Britain and Ireland
- Tower houses in the Balkans
- Townhouse
- Townhouse (Great Britain)
- Tracery
- Trachelium
- Traditional architecture of Enggano
- Traditional Chinese house architecture
- Traditional Korean roof construction
- Traditional Persian residential architecture
- Traditional Thai house
- Traditionalist School
- Transept
- Transom
- Transverse rib
- Trefoil
- Trefoil arch
- Trellis
- Triadic pyramid
- Tribune
- Triclinium
- Trifora
- Triforium
- Triglyph
- Trilithon
- Trinitarian steeple
- Triodetic dome
- Triquetra
- Triumphal arch
- Trombe wall
- Trompe-l'œil
- Trophy of arms
- Trullo
- Trumeau
- Truss
- Truth to materials
- Truth window
- Tsumairi
- The Leeds Look
- Tudor architecture
- Tudor Revival architecture
- Türbe
- Turret
- Twig work
- Two-up two-down
- Tympanum

== U ==
- Ubaid house
- Ukrainian architecture
- Ukrainian Baroque
- Ultimate bungalow
- Uma
- Umayyad architecture
- Undercroft
- Unfinished building
- Universal design
- Upper Lusatian house
- Upright and Wing
- Urban canyon
- Urban castle
- Urban design
- Urban planning
- Urban planning in ancient Egypt
- Urban planning in Australia
- Urban planning in communist countries
- Urban planning in Nazi Germany
- Usonia
- Uthland-Frisian house

== V ==
- Vainakh tower architecture
- Valencian Art Nouveau
- Valencian Gothic
- Vancouver Special
- Vancouverism
- Vanderbilt houses
- Vastu shastra
- Vatadage
- Vault
- Velarium
- Vellar cupola
- Venereum
- Venetian Gothic architecture
- Venetian Renaissance architecture
- Venetian window
- Venice Biennale of Architecture
- Ventilation
- Ventilation shaft
- Veranda
- Verify in field
- Vernacular architecture
- Vernacular architecture in Norway
- Vernacular architecture of the Carpathians
- Vernacular residential architecture of Western Sichuan
- Vesara
- Vestibule
- Viaduct
- Victorian architecture
- Victorian house
- Victorian restoration
- Victory column
- Viga
- Vihāra
- Vijayanagara architecture
- Viking ring fortress
- Villa
- Villa rustica
- Vimana
- Vineyard style
- Visigothic art and architecture
- Vitruvian module
- Vitruvian opening
- Vitruvian scroll
- Volume and displacement indicators for an architectural structure
- Volute
- Vomitorium
- Votive column
- Voussoir

== W ==
- Wada
- Waldlerhaus
- Wall
- Wall dormer
- Wall footing
- Walipini
- Wantilan
- Wat
- Watchtower
- Water castle
- Watergate
- Waterleaf
- Water table
- Water tower
- Wattle and daub
- Wayō
- Wealden hall house
- Weavers' cottage
- Weavers' windows
- Wedding-cake style
- Weep
- Well house
- Welsh Tower houses
- Wessobrunner School
- Western Chalukya architecture
- Western false front architecture
- Westwork
- Wetu
- Wharenui
- Whispering gallery
- Widow's walk
- Wilhelminism
- Wind brace
- Windcatcher
- Window
- Window blind
- Window sill
- Wing
- Wing wall
- Witch window
- Witches' stones
- Wooden synagogues in the Polish–Lithuanian Commonwealth
- World Architecture Festival
- World Architecture Survey
- WPA Rustic
- Wunderlich

== X ==
- Xylotechnigraphy
- Xystum
- Xystus

== Y ==
- Yagura
- Yakhchāl
- Yalı
- Yaodong
- Yeseria
- Yett

== Z ==
- Z-plan castle
- Zakopane Style
- Zarih
- Zellige
- Zenshūyō
- Zero carbon housing
- Zero-energy building
- Zingel
- Zoomorphic architecture
- Zoophorus
- Zvonnitsa
- Zwinger

== Lists ==
- Architects
- Architects of supertall buildings
- Architectural historians
- Architecture schools
- Architectural styles
- Architecture awards
- Architecture criticism
- Architecture firms
- Architecture magazines
- Bizarre buildings
- Building types
- Buildings and structures
- Firsts in architecture
- Greek and Roman architectural records
- Historic houses
- House styles
- House types
- Largest domes
- Nonbuilding structure types
- Oldest known surviving buildings
- Professional architecture organizations
- Tallest buildings
- Twisted buildings
- Visionary tall buildings and structures

== Category ==
- Category:Architecture

== See also ==
- Outline of architecture
- Outline of classical architecture
- Table of years in architecture
- Timeline of architecture
- Glossary of architecture
