= Set-off =

Set-off may refer to:

- Set-off (architecture), horizontal line shown on a floorplan indicating a reduced wall thickness, and consequently the part of the thicker portion appears projecting before the thinner
- Set-off (law), reduction of a claim by deducting the amount of a valid countervailing claim
- Set-off (printing), ink passing from one printed sheet to another because the ink has not had the chance to dry, which causes the sheets of paper to stick together

== See also ==
- Offset (disambiguation)
