= Combination stair =

A combination stair is an architectural element found in traditional houses in North America where two sets of stairs merge into one at a landing.

== Background ==
Floor plan of typical combination stair.

Large, traditional houses were frequently designed with two stairs: a formal front stairway for use by the family and guests and a utilitarian back stair for use by household staff. The combination stair is a T-shaped compromise design popular in the nineteenth century that was found in some moderate-sized houses. In this design, both the formal front stair and the utilitarian back stair ran to a common intermediate landing. One common stair then extended from this intermediate landing to the second floor of the house.

== Current usage ==
The combination stair became less common in the 20th century. As houses became less formal and household staff became less common, the need for both front and back stairs declined. Many houses were designed with a single stair for common use. However, since the 1980s, house sizes have increased significantly and designs have become more elaborate and more complex. Multiple stairs are becoming more common once again. Combination stairs are occasionally seen in new house designs.
