= Architecture of Mangalorean Catholics =

The architecture of Mangalorean Catholics has strong Mangalorean, Italian, and Portuguese influences.

== Mangalore tiles ==
Their Mangalore tiles are considered to be the most notable contribution to the world. These red Mangalore tiles, prepared from hard clay, are in great demand throughout India, Myanmar, and Sri Lanka, and are even shipped to East Africa, the Middle-East, Europe, and Australia. These were the only tiles to be recommended for Government buildings in India during the British regime. These tiles still define Mangalore's skyline and characterize its urban setting.

Mangalore tile

=== Mangalore tiles ===
Mangalore Tiles are the form of tiles used to build roof of the house instead of concrete. These kind of tiles are most popularly used in coastal Karnataka, Kerala, and some parts of Goa.

=== Unique ===
These are Red colored clay tiles, unique in shape and size are so famous and export to all the corners of world. They are unique and are made or available in different size and shapes depending on the users need.

=== Eco friendly and long lasting ===
They provide excellent ventilation especially during summer and aesthetically as well. Some of them are especially made to be placed over kitchen and bathroom for the smoke to escape. Over a period of time, these tiles become dark to black from constant exposure to soot and smoke. These tiles are not only eco-friendly but also cheap, durable and costs only one third that of cement. Some of the buildings which are 100 yrs old still have tile roofing!

=== Manufacturing process ===
First part is to collect enough clay and place it in a mold and is cut to exact measurement. Then that rectangular piece of clay with exact length and thickness is placed on another machine which puts the factory logo and shapes it into a tile. Then with hand any extra clay is removed and sent to be carried for firing and later glazing. It was interesting to say the least to see how both men and women worked cooperatively to produce the final product. It is a very delicate and detailed process starting from collection of clay to the final product to be fired. Once fired and glazed it is ready and is stored for shipping.

=== Export ===
These Tiles are export to Fareast, Europe, Australia, Africa and as close as Middle Eastern Countries.

Nowadays people becoming more stylish and modern so no ones interested in these old styled Tile houses, so concrete structures occupied its place. But still Modern designed houses are using these tiles as Style.

== Traditional houses ==
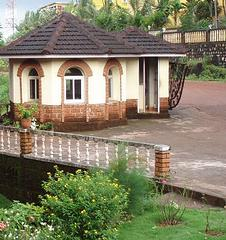
A traditional house of a Mangalorean Catholic family, constructed using olden-style architecture.

Their traditional houses have spacious porticos, red cement or terra cotta floors, and are topped with Mangalore tiles with fruit trees outside the house. This style of house has been borrowed from the other Mangalorean communities and are only observed in Mangalore.

== Churches ==
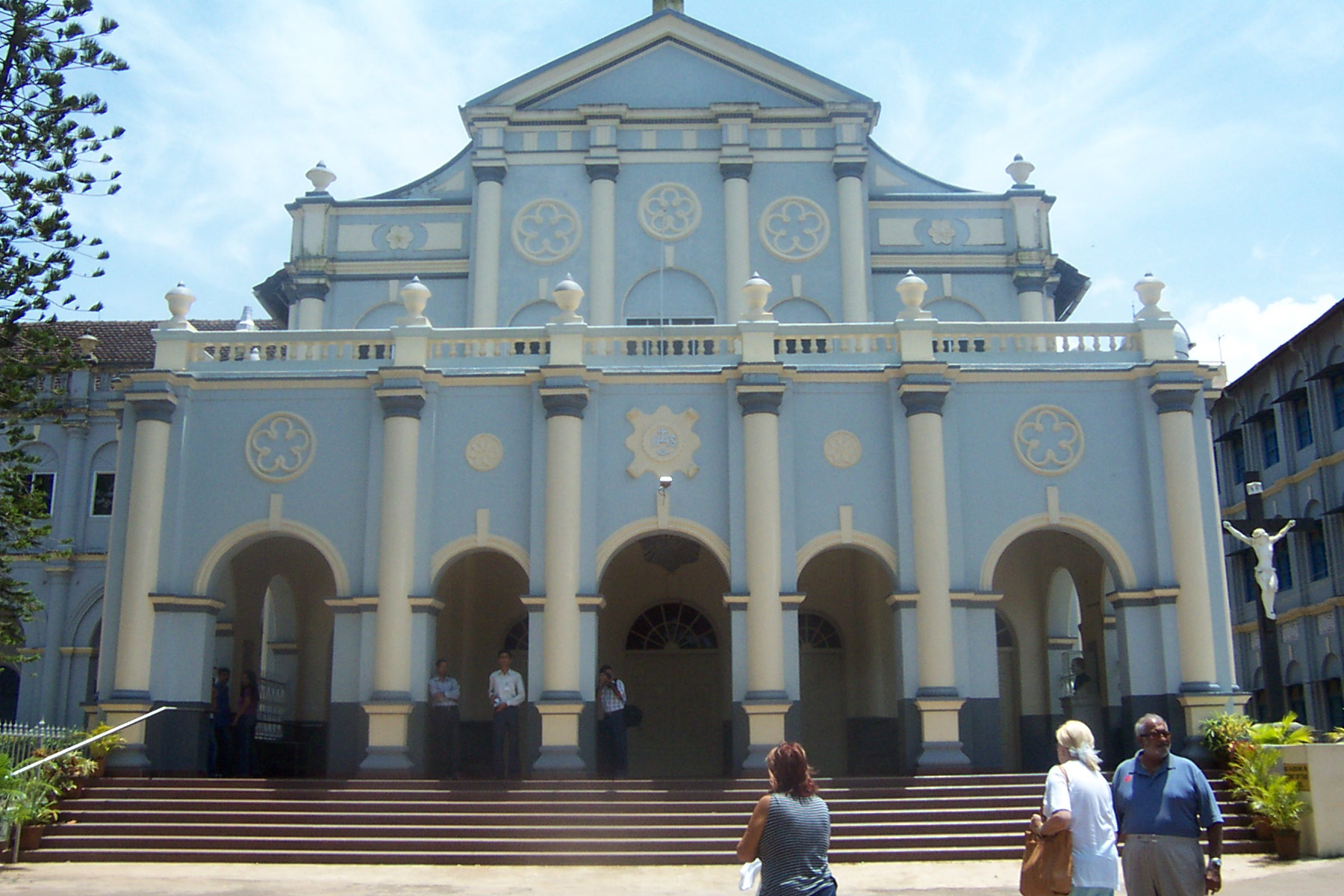
The St Aloysius Chapel in Mangalore, built in 1899–1900; the wonderful series of paintings on its interior roof and walls made by Br. Antonio Moscheni, an Italian Jesuit.

The transfer of the Mangalore Vicariate to the Italian Jesuits in 1878 and the establishment of the Mangalore Diocese in 1886 mandated the arrival of many Roman Catholic missionaries, particularly the Italian and Portuguese Jesuits, who were instrumental in building many churches in Mangalore. The Mangalorean Catholic style of constructing churches thus came to be influenced by the Italian and Portuguese style.
