= Realism (architectural history) =

Realism is the name now given to an approach to architecture by British architects from the 1840s onwards, who aimed to emphasise the 'real' nature of building forms and materials in the buildings they designed. Although the use of the term in architectural history dates from the 1980s, Victorian architects and writers are recorded as using the word 'real' to describe their intentions, and ‘unreal’ to describe architecture they disapproved of.

Realism is most closely associated with Augustus Pugin and in particular with his 1841 book The True Principles of Pointed or Christian Architecture. The message of this book was that the appearance of buildings and all their details should directly derive from their construction and use. As Pugin put it:

there should be no features about a building that are not necessary for convenience, construction, or propriety . . . the smallest detail should have a meaning or serve a purpose.

The effect of this message was that Gothic Revival architects responded to the then-prevalent low standards of construction by emphasising the constructional role and physical qualities of the materials they used. This meant in practice that brick and stonework replaced stucco or cement render in the design of quality buildings, and in the best cases details from eaves to door handles were especially designed to form a coherent set for each project. Realist houses, such as those designed by Pugin himself, were intended to make their essential construction method obvious through simple observation; the best example is Pugin’s rectory at Rampisham, Dorset, designed in 1845.

With the rapid spread of Pugin’s ideas through influential and prolific architects including George Gilbert Scott, George Edmund Street, and William Butterfield in the mid-nineteenth century, Realist architecture appeared in nearly every town and village in England, at least in the form of a restored (in fact, often largely rebuilt) parish church.

The architectural historian Chris Brooks first referred to Realism in his book Signs for the Times of 1984, and then again, offering the alternative 'reality', in his widely read Gothic Revival of 2000. Brooks compared Pugin’s concept of the 'real' to that of Victorian authors and painters:

Pugin’s response parallels those of Carlyle and Dickens, Ruskin and the Pre-Raphaelites both quantitatively, insisting upon the sheer amount of individual detail, and qualitatively, insisting upon the separable identity of each detail. Every element of the Pugin building is true, true to structure, to function, to material, to a religious meaning; above all, true to itself, its own isolable reality.

In Brooks’ usage, the word also implies investing inanimate objects with real human characteristics, for example with 'honesty', an idea that was popular with late nineteenth-century arts and crafts architects. These architects sometimes believed that a realist approach to material had a "religious" approach to it comparable to that of Pugin fifty years beforehand.

Realism can be seen as a pragmatic, non-intellectualising British variant of the Functionalism or Rationalism that was developing over the same period in European architecture.
