= Nano House =

The Nano House is an American tiny house from 2017. It was named to be the world's smallest sustainable house.

The Nano Living System is a Swiss-made "green" pre-engineered concept for residential use. The design was based on a combination of pre-engineered SIPs (made from cement fiberboard, recycled light gauge steel, and polyurethane foam), the creation of flexible spaces (through Nano Living Systems' "suspending technology"), and the use of renewable energy systems.

The Nano House can be used by a family of three in an area consisting of 25 square metres (270 sq ft). This is made possible by transforming what is a common living space by day into two separate bedrooms by night (using "suspending technology").
