= 13th century BC in architecture =

== Events ==
- c. 1300 BC – End of Harappan architecture.

== Buildings and structures ==
=== Buildings ===
- Ramesses II expands Luxor Temple.
- Abu Simbel constructed.
- Chogha Zanbil built
