= Casa montañesa =

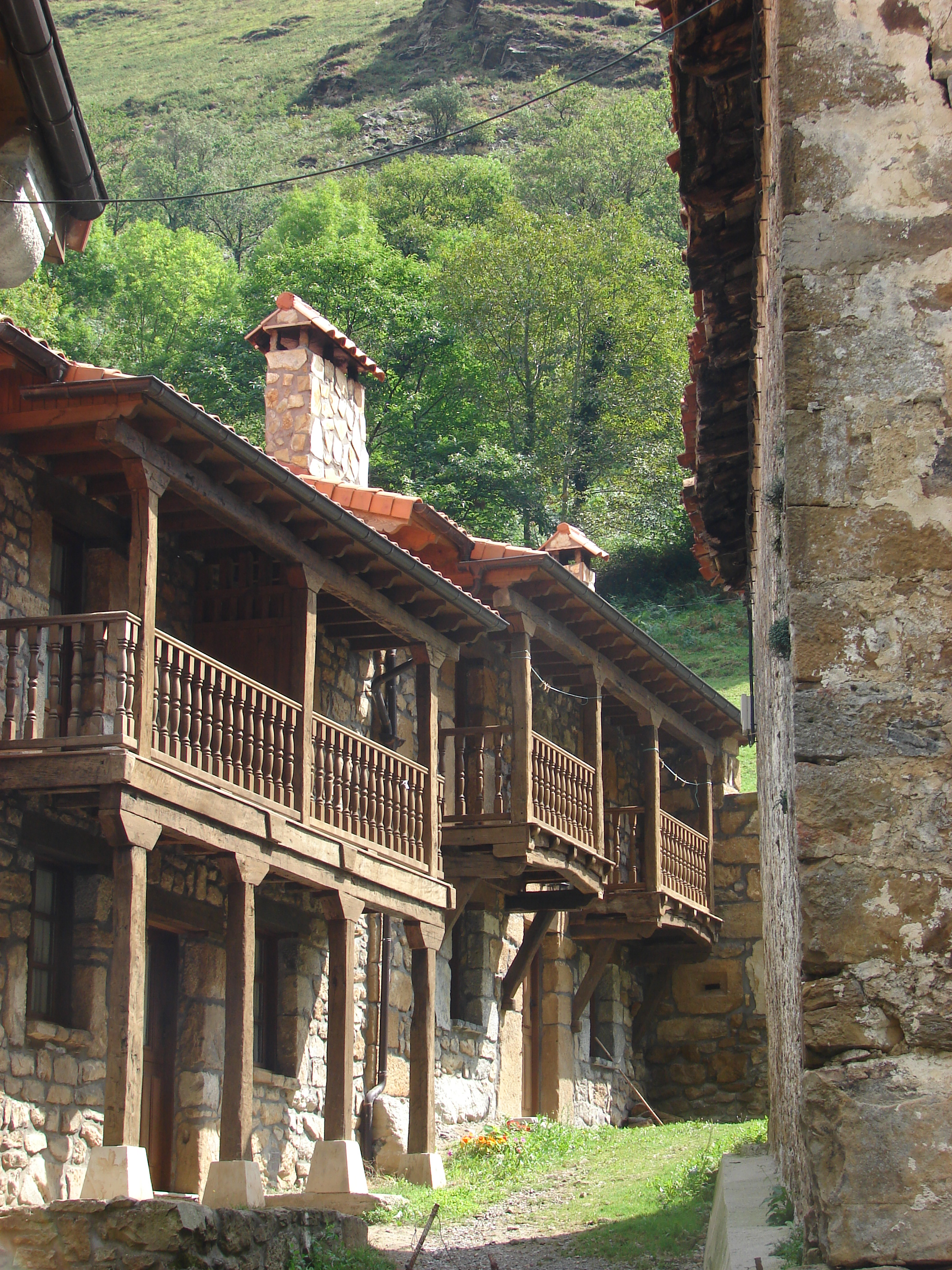
Cantabrian traditional houses in Asón (Soba) with a balcony topped by an extended overhang

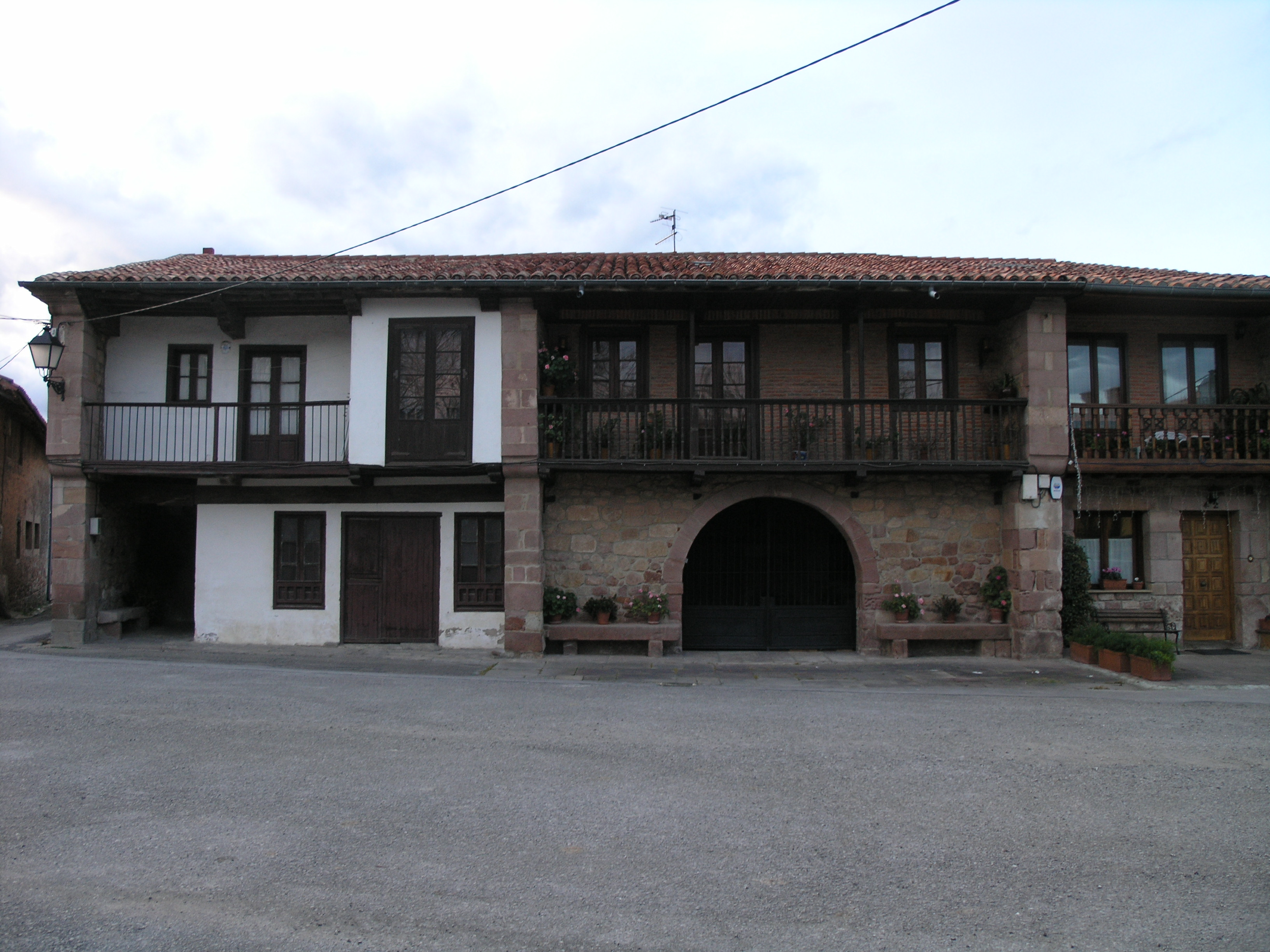
Casa montañesa between medians in Viérnoles with masonry walls, supporting the balcony and framing a porch

Casa montañesa is a form of traditional construction of La Montaña in the communities of Cantabria, east of Asturias and northern Castile and León in northern Spain. It should not be confused with casona montañesa, which differs due to its grander style and incorporation of other features.

This housing style developed from the sixteenth through the eighteenth centuries and becoming widely seen by the end of the nineteenth century, when it was popularized by the Spanish architect Leonardo Rucabado. It was widely seen across Cantabria.

== Features ==
This type of traditional country house is the most characteristic of Cantabria. It highlights the south façade, open to the sun, with the other walls made of thick rough masonry. The corners are usually of ashlars with re-enclosure at all the spans. The entrance is through a gate of one or two arcs, sufficient to allow passage of a cart into an entryway, leading to the kitchen (although in some houses the kitchen is on the upper level), stables, wine cellar, pantry and stairs to the upper floor. In some areas, there are passageways to enter the upper floor from the outside.

The upper floor contains the bedrooms, two of which face the balcony. The interior walls originally are usually made of wood, although in recent times have been replaced by brick.

The sun area is the most typical element of this construction. It is a balcony run with wood rail protected from wind and rain by the overhanging roof and the projecting sidewalls.

The walls are usually topped by wooden trim pieces rough but of classic profiles, serving to support beams of the edge as securing the canes that form the overhang. The wood is usually painted dark brown.
