= Residential architecture in Ibiza =

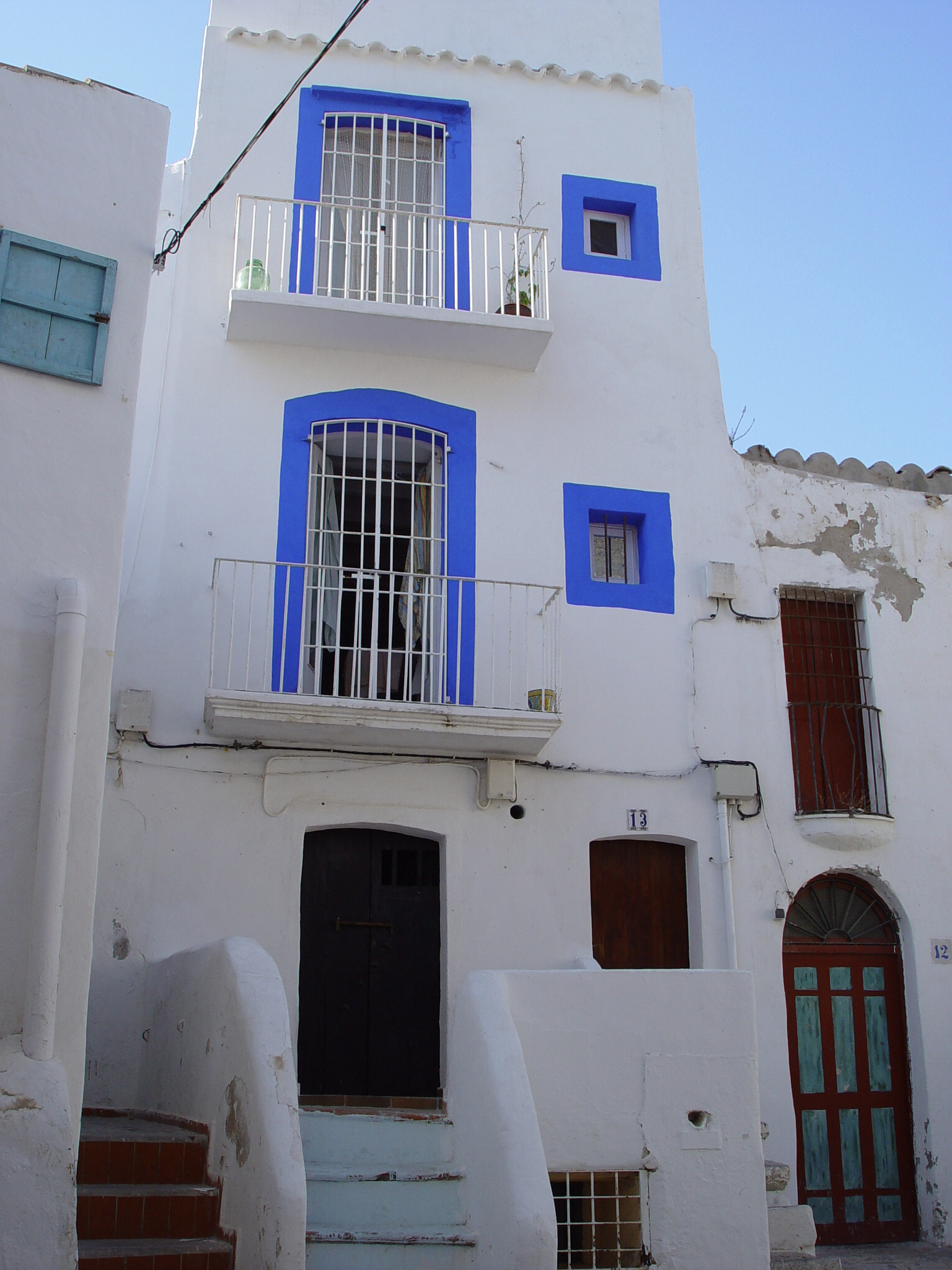
Buildings in Ibiza (town)

The residential architecture in Ibiza includes typical white modular houses built in the Mediterranean style. The appearance of traditional residential buildings was influenced by various cultures appearing for centuries on the island. Assyrian (ground plan) and Egyptian (façade type) impact is particularly visible.

Traditional houses located in almost every part of Ibiza consist of independent modules arranged on a rectangular plan. The walls of the buildings are made of thick quadrangular stone slabs covered with a white layer of limestone. The buildings feature flat roofs based on wooden ceiling beams. Rainwater that accumulates on the roof surface is often channelled into special water tanks and reused by house owners. The traditional homes in Ibiza are made of stone slabs and juniper trunks that are craved and sawed in order to use them in floors, beams and posts.

What distinguishes traditional Ibiza houses is their white colour that has been an inspiration for artists, e.g. painter Vincent Ferrer Guasch for years. The buildings have become an integral part of the island’s landscape and that is why, in many world areas, Ibiza has been called the "white island". The tradition of whitewashing walls with limestone is connected with the conviction that white colour protects against heat and reflects sun light. In the past, limestone was also chosen due to economic reasons. This relatively cheap and easily accessible material looks aesthetically pleasing and the process of whitewashing does not require technical skills. Unfortunately, the limestone layer is not durable and requires annual do-overs. Churches in Ibiza are just another instance of buildings that require systematic whitewashing.

The traditional whitewashed houses can usually be found far from popular tourist resorts. Rural houses are usually located in a dispersed way and their location depends on the conditions of the natural environment. The houses are rarely grouped. The main advantage of choosing the areas located far away from the rocky coast is the fertile soil. That is why, olive groves as well as almond and citrus orchards are usually planted in proximity to rural houses.
