= Consumption wall =

Type of wall built in Medieval Europe

A consumption wall is a very wide wall, which appears as a double-sided structure in-filled with smaller stones.

An example can be seen in the Duddon Valley, Cumbria at Low Hall. Another example can be found near Harlech, Gwynedd, Wales which measures about six feet wide, indicating that they are spread throughout British agricultural regions.

== Purpose ==
Consumption walls serve a double purpose of absorbing excess stone from the surrounding land, clearing it, while also enclosing it.

Consumption walls are thought to date from the medieval period, and are generally made up from glacial deposits left strewn in the area.
