= Lopo house =

Lopo house is East Nusa Tenggara traditional house in Indonesia. Lopo house doesn't have wall. People from East Nusa Tenggara used to call this house as versatile house. One of the tribes who live at Lopo house is Abui tribe. Lopo house is made from Bamboo. This house have three floor with their function. First floor used to be place to people from Abui tribes talk each other. Second and third floor used to be place to keep food and other stuff.
