= Aerary =

Treasure room

Aerary is a room in a building that was used to contain something precious, such as treasure. An example is the aerary porch in St. George's Chapel at Windsor Castle, which was built in 1353–1354. It was used as the entrance to a new college being established there by Edward III.
