= 25th century BC in architecture =

== Buildings and structures ==
=== Buildings ===
- The first stones are erected at Stonehenge.
