= Walipini =

Earth-sheltered structure for growing plants

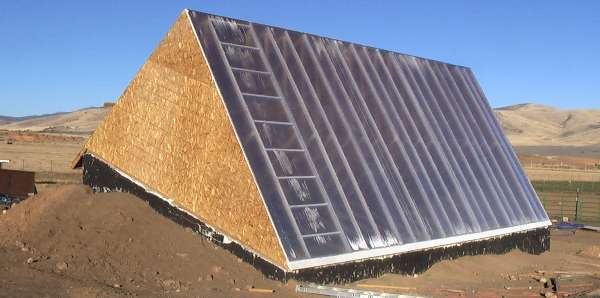
A walipini in Utah

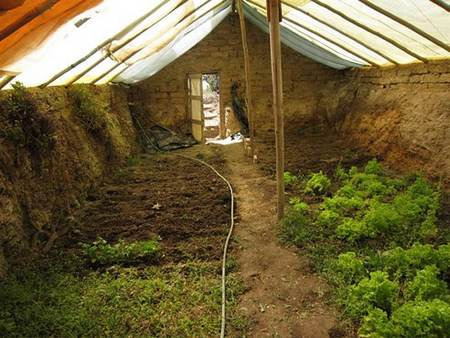
The interior of a walipini

A walipini is an earth-sheltered cold frame. It derives its name from the Aymaran languages. It is similar in concept to the pineapple pit that was used, as the name implies, to cultivate pineapple and other exotic fruits in Victorian era Britain and in the cold plains of pre-revolution Russia.

In the Soviet era, similar techniques were developed to grow citrus fruits (oranges, lemons, mandarins, tangerines, grapefruits, limes, pomelos) at temperatures of minus 30 degrees Celsius. By 1950, the Soviet Union boasted 30,000 hectares of citrus plantations producing 200,000 tonnes of fruits per year.

The walipini is attractive to practitioners of permaculture and the sustainability movement because it allows for crops to be grown in greenhouse-like settings whilst requiring little to no heating.
