= 14th century BC in architecture =

== Buildings and structures ==
=== Buildings ===
- Amenhotep III begins the construction of Luxor Temple.
