= Vellar cupola =

A vellar cupola is a small domed structure or cupola on a larger roof or dome, squared off so that it rests on four corners, as if it was an inflated sail. The squared sections are usually glazed. The corners are pendentive forms.
