= Roshandan =

A roshandan, raushandan or roushandan (Hindi: रोशनदान, रौशनदान, romanized: rōśandān, rauśandān, Urdu: روشندان, romanized: rōśandān, rauśandān, Persian: روشن‌دان, romanized: rōšan-dān, rawšan-dān) is a feature of many dwelling structures in North India and Pakistan that is a combined skylight and ventilating window. Roshandans are usually located high on a room's walls, and often on top of windows. They are essentially smaller windows that swivel open when needed. Smaller roshandans are sometimes called roshandanis. The high location of roshandans means that, for part of the summer (except for the months when the loo winds blow in the region), they can be kept open to allow heated air just below the ceiling to escape while retaining relatively cooler air inside. In wintertime, they are kept shut and used purely as skylights.

== Etymology ==
The term roshandan literally means "that which has/admits light" in several Indo-Aryan languages, derived from Persian. Though the word roshandan is often translated to ventilator in South Asian English (i.e., English as used in the Indian subcontinent, aka South Asia), this is incorrect, literally speaking.
