= 21st-century domes =

Domes are architectural elements shaped like the upper hollow half of a sphere. Used throughout architectural history, they continue to be used in the 21st century. Domes built in the 21st century benefit from advances in the production of materials such as steel. Modern structural engineering also allows variety and large scope.

== Design ==
San Jose City Hall, California

The variety of modern domes over sports stadiums, exhibition halls, and auditoriums have been enabled by developments in materials such as steel, reinforced concrete and plastics. Their uses over department stores and "futuristic video-hologram entertainment centres" exploit a variety of non-traditional materials. The use of design processes that integrate numerical control machines, computer design, virtual reconstructions, and industrial prefabrication allow for the creation of dome forms with complex geometry, such as the 2004 ellipsoid bubbles of Nardini Company's production district designed by Massimiliano Fuksas.

== Examples ==
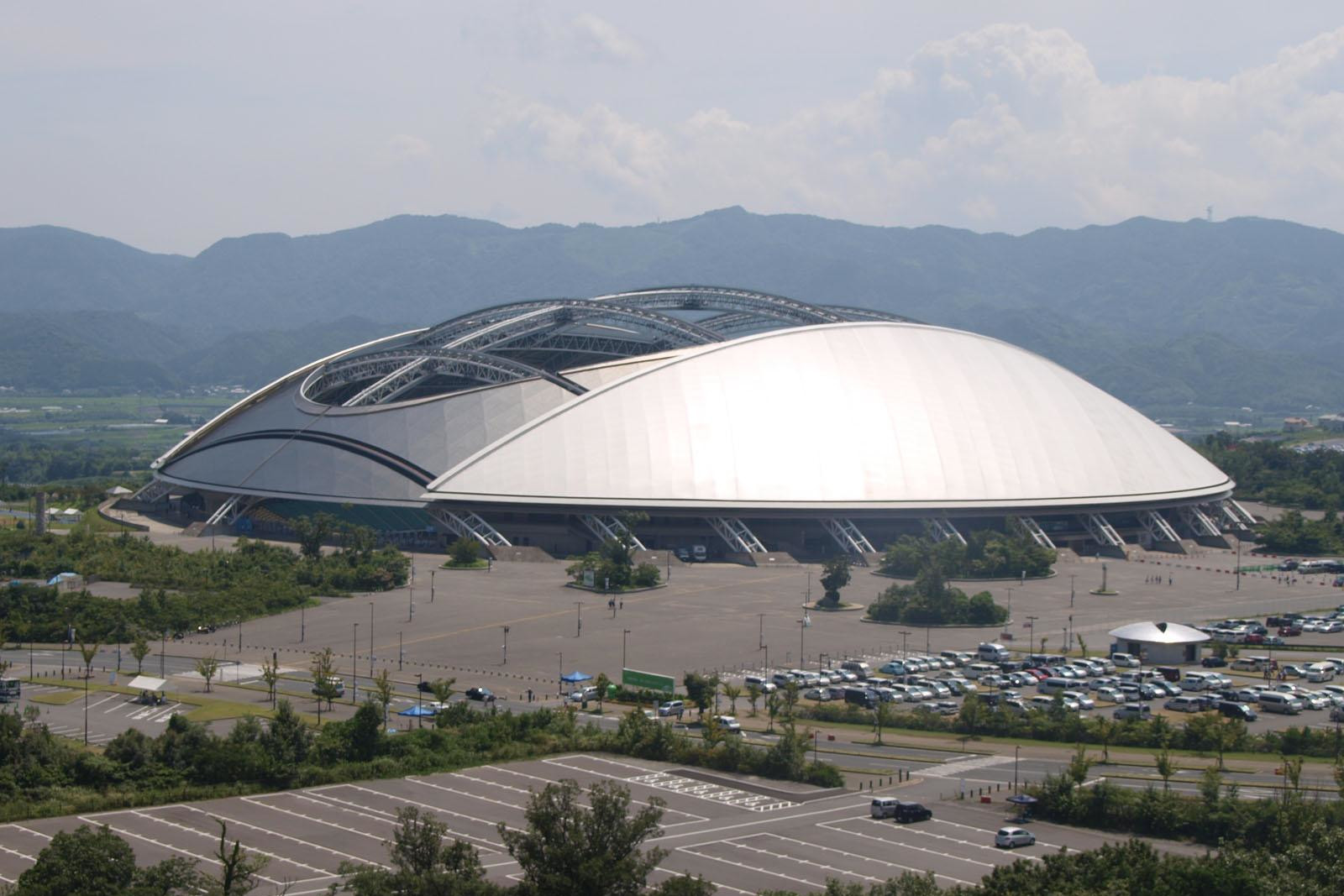
Ōita Stadium in Japan

Ōita Stadium was built in 2001 as a mostly fixed semi-spherical roof 274 m (899 ft) wide with two large membrane-covered panels that can slide down from the center to opposite sides. The Sapporo Dome was completed in 2001 with a span of 218 meters. Singapore's National Stadium was completed in 2014 with the largest dome in the world at 310 meters in span. It uses a post-tensioned concrete ring beam to support steel trusses that enable two halves of a section of the dome to retract.

== Bibliography ==
- Friedman, Noémi; Farkas, György (2011). "Roof Structures in Motion: On Retractable and Deployable Roof Structures Enabling Quick Construction or Adaptation to External Excitations" (PDF). Concrete Structures. pp. 41–50. Archived from the original (PDF) on 2013-05-14.
- Hourihane, Colum, ed. (2012). The Grove Encyclopedia of Medieval Art and Architecture. Oxford University Press. ISBN 978-0-19-539536-5.
- Lewis, Clive; King, Mike (2014). "Designing the world's largest dome: the National Stadium roof of Singapore Sports Hub". The IES Journal Part A: Civil & Structural Engineering. 7 (3). Taylor & Francis: 127–150. doi:10.1080/19373260.2014.911485. S2CID 110806778.
- McNeil, Ian, ed. (2002). An Encyclopaedia of the History of Technology. Routledge. ISBN 978-1-134-98165-6.
- Morganti, R.; Tosone, A.; Abita, M.; Di Donato, D. (2019), "Symbol and technique of steel domes in Italy", in Cruz, Paulo J.S. (ed.), Structures and Architecture – Bridging the Gap and Crossing Borders: Proceedings of the Fourth International Conference on Structures and Architecture (ICSA 2019), July 24–26, 2019, Lisbon, Portugal, CRC Press, pp. 835–842, ISBN 978-1-351-85815-1
- Takenaka Corporation (2000), Dome Transitions Map, Takenaka Corporation, archived from the original on October 6, 2000
