= Cottage window =

Style of double-hung window

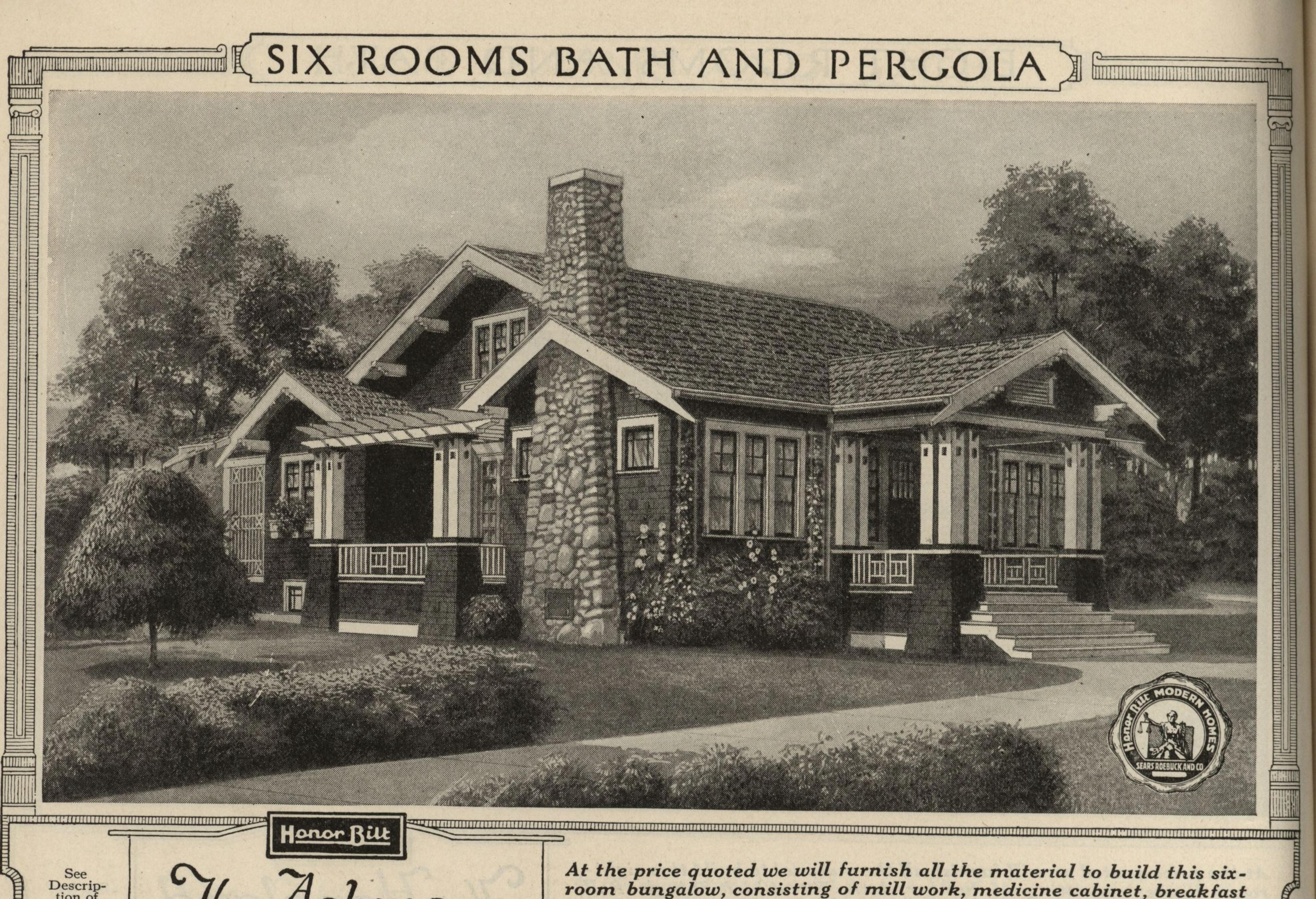
Cottage windows are visible in this view of a bungalow-style house dating to 1921.

A cottage window is a double-hung window — i.e., a window with two sashes sliding up and down, hung with one atop the other in the same frame — in which the upper sash is smaller (shorter) than the lower one.

The upper sash often contains smaller lights divided by muntins (often known as a "divided light pattern" or "grille"), although in some cases both sashes may be divided.

Cottage windows are especially characteristic of bungalow or Craftsman-style houses. It is also called a "front window".
