= 27th century BC in architecture =

== Buildings and structures ==
=== Buildings ===
- 2670: The Pyramid of Djoser is built.
- 2686-2613: The Pyramid of Sinki is built.

== Births ==
- Imhotep: the first architect known by name.
