= Pila (architecture) =

In Sri Lankan architecture, a pila is a type of veranda that is most notably found in Sinhalese farm houses. The floor or platform is projected beyond the walls creating a continuous ledge on the building exterior. Buildings that featured a courtyard could have an inner pila.

== Construction ==
The pila is built from stone and earth brick, smoothly plastered and finished with cow dung, creating a hygienic, hard and impervious surface. Higher status houses had more rooms connecting to the internal pila.

During the 19th and early 20th centuries, visitors would be received and entertained on the pila. For people of lower status, kolombu ketes – or low wooden seats, would occasionally be brought out. In later times, due to Hindu influence, visitors of the same status as the owners (dictated by caste) were invited into the courtyard but were rarely invited to sleep there. However, in cases of emergency those visitors might stay in a front room.

== See also ==
- Engawa

== Sources ==
- Coomaraswamy, Ananda (2011). Mediaeval Sinhalese art: being a monograph on mediaeval Sinhalese arts and crafts, mainly as surviving in the eighteenth century, with an account of the structure of society and the status of the craftsmen (Third ed.). Dehiwala: Tisara Prakasakayao. ISBN 9789555641258.
- Lewcock, Ronald; Sonsoni, Barbara; Senanayake, Laki (2014). The architecture of an island : the living legacy of Sri Lanka : a thousand years of architecture illustrated by outstanding examples of religious, public, and domestic buildings. Sri Lanka: Barefoot (Pvt.) Ltd. ISBN 9559466003.
