= 5th century BC in architecture =

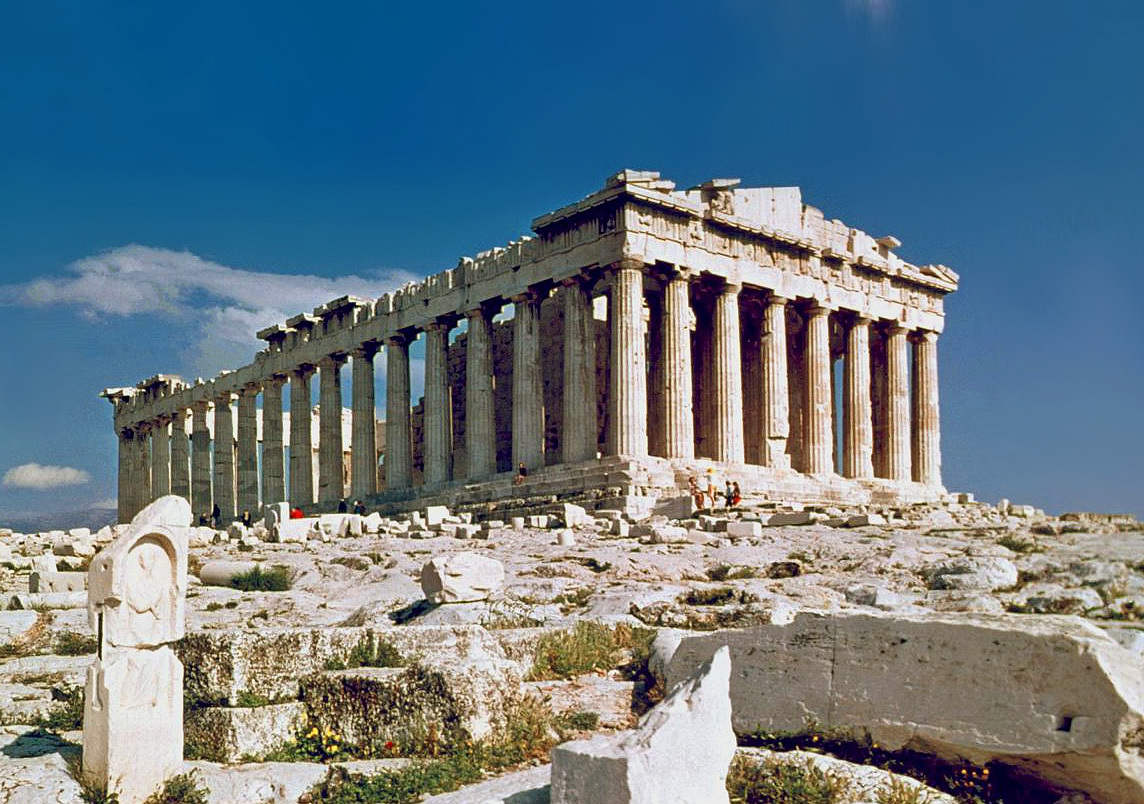
The Parthenon in Athens

== Buildings and structures ==
=== Buildings ===
- 447–432 BC – Modern Parthenon in Athens built by Ictinus and Callicrates under the direction of the sculptor Phidias.
- About 430 BC – Temple of Apollo Epicurius at Bassae, in Arcadia constructed.
