= 21st century BC in architecture =

== Buildings and structures ==
=== Buildings ===
- Great Ziggurat of Ur constructed

== See also ==
- 21st century BC
- Timeline of architecture
