= Neo-Tiwanakan architecture =

The Neo-Tiwanakan or Pseudo-Tiwanakan architecture is an architectural style developed by the architect Emilio Villanueva Peñaranda between 1930 and 1948, inspired by the designs of the Pre-Columbian archeological site of Tiwanaku in Bolivia.

== Origins ==
Emilio Villanueva popularized the Neo-Tiwanakan style in the city of La Paz during the 1930s. The inspiration for these designs was the blueprints for ideal reconstructions of Tiwanaku elaborated by Edmund Kiss in 1937; these designs were adapted by Villanueva to give them an urban and contemporaneous style.
