= Chantlate =

In architecture, a chantlate is a piece of wood fastened near the ends of the rafters, and projecting beyond the wall, to support two or three rows of tiles, so placed to prevent rain water from trickling down the sides of the wall.
