= Set-off (architecture) =

In architecture and masonry, the term set-off or off-set is given to the part of a wall or other architectural feature, which is exposed when the portion above is of a reduced thickness. In plinths, this is generally simply chamfered. In other parts of stonework, the set-off is generally concealed by a projecting string course. In parapets, where the upper part projects (or is proud of) the lower, the break is generally hidden by a corbel. The portions of buttress caps which recede one behind another are also called sets-off. The term for a set-off near ground level is water table, often sloped at the top to throw off water.

== Bibliography ==
- Parker, John Henry (1888), A Concise Glossary of Architure, london: Parker and Co
