= Glossary of ancient Roman culture =

This glossary of the culture of ancient Rome includes terms used by academics studying Roman history and archaeologists excavating Roman sites.

== A ==
Acroter

A pedestal at the corners or peak of a roof to support an ornament.
Aedicula
A small shrine or pavilion-like structure enclosing a niche for a statue.. An aedicula often consists of a pediment resting on a pair of columns. In Roman paintings it is used by itself or to frame a picture or figure. Plural Aediculae.
Ala
A side room or room on the "wings" of the atrium. Plural Alae.
Amphora
A conical storage vase with two handles used to store and transport both liquids and dry contents. They were usually ceramic but examples of metal and other materials have been found. Typically amphora held less than 50 kilograms (110 lb) so it could be lifted by a single individual and were produced with a pointed base to allow upright storage by embedding in soft ground, such as sand.
Anta
Pier or pilaster formed by a thickening at the end of a wall; its capital and base differ from those of the columns forming part of the same order. Antae (plural) often occur in pairs beyond the faces of the end walls. The columns are said to be in antis.
Apotropaic
Magic properties of an object, image, or symbol intended to turn away harm or evil influences, as in deflecting misfortune or averting the evil eye.
Armilla
Bracelet, or armlet, normally in metal and worn in pairs, one for each arm or wrist. Plural Armillae.
Apodyterium
A dressing room in a bath complex.
Arretine ware
Ceramics produced in the Tuscan city of Arrezo, Arretine sigillata, a coral red tableware with relief decorations applied by punching. These ceramics were marked in the earliest period by a stamp "in planta pedis" resembling the sole of a foot that was inscribed with the name of the workshop and/or that of the ceramist. Sometimes referred to as Arrezo ware.
Ashlar
Precisely cut stone capable of very thin joints between blocks, and the visible face of the stone may be quarry-faced or feature a variety of treatments: tooled, smoothly polished or rendered with another material for decorative effect.
As (Roman coin)
Roman bronze, then later copper, coin used during the Augustine period equal in value to 1/4 of a sestertius. At that time the daily wage of a Roman laborer was equal to three sestertius.
Astragal
Molding profile composed of a half-round surface surrounded by two flat planes (fillets). An astragal is sometimes referred to as a miniature torus. It can be an architectural element used at the top or base of a column, but is also employed as a framing device on furniture and woodwork.
Atrium
Large open air or skylight covered space providing light and ventilation to the interior.
Attic
That part of the entablature above the cornice used to hide the roof of a structure or to make the structure more impressive.
Auctoritas
General level of prestige a person had in Roman society, his clout, influence, and ability to rally support around his will. Auctoritas was not merely political, however; it had a numinous content and symbolized the mysterious "power of command" of heroic Roman figures.
Augur
Priest whose main role was to interpret the will of the gods by studying the flight of birds – whether they were flying in groups or alone, what noises they made as they flew, direction of flight, and what species of birds they were.
Aureus
Gold coin of ancient Rome originally valued at 25 pure silver denarii. Before the time of Julius Caesar the aureus was struck infrequently, probably because gold was seen as a mark of un-Roman luxury.

== B ==
Bacchant
Followers of Dionysus (Roman Bacchus). See also Maenad, Satyr, Silenos
Balneum
Bath suite in a private Roman home understood to be smaller than a thermae Plural is Balneae.
Balsamarium
an ancient vessel for holding balsam, an aromatic resin exuded by various trees and shrubs and used as a base for certain fragrances and medical and cosmetic preparations. Sometimes called an unguentarium or a lacrimarium (lacrimatoio in Italian)
Barrel vault
An architectural element formed by the extrusion of a single curve (or pair of curves, in the case of a pointed barrel vault) along a given distance.
Biccieri
Drinking glass or beaker.
Bucranium
Carved decoration depicting the skull of an ox commonly used in Classical architecture that originated with the practice of displaying garlanded, sacrificial oxen, whose heads were displayed on the walls of temples. Plural is Bucrania.

== C ==
Cartibulum
Oblong table of stone, standing on one or more pedestals.
Caryatid
Sculpted female figure serving as an architectural support taking the place of a column or a pillar.
Cenaculum
Initially, a dining room on the upper floor of a Roman house but eventually was used to refer to an entire apartment or even the entire upper floor.
Chamfer
Transitional edge between two faces of an object. Sometimes defined as a form of bevel, it is often created at a 45° angle between two adjoining right-angled faces
Cithara
Ancient Greek musical instrument in the yoke lutes family that was a seven-stringed professional version of the four-stringed lyre. Also spelled Kithara.
Clientela
Clients or dependents of the pater familias. Plural is Clientelae.
Cocciopesto
Building material made from crushed tiles or bricks.
Compluvium
Open space left in the roof of the atrium of a Roman house (domus) for lighting and collection of rain water.
Cornice
Upper section of an entablature, a projecting shelf along the top of a wall often supported by brackets or corbels.
Cruma
Tough but porous igneous rock.
Cubiculum
Private room in an ancient Roman house occupied by a high-status family member used for the functions of a modern bedroom, sleep and sex, as well as for business meetings, the reception of important guests and the display of the most highly-prized works of art in the house.

== D ==
Denarius
Roman silver coin originally equal to 10 asses or 10 pounds of bronze.
Dentil
One of a series of small rectangular blocks projecting from a molding or beneath a cornice.
Diaeta
Room or set of rooms with a view of a garden, landscape, or seascape. Plural is Diaetae
Dolium
Large earthenware vase or vessel used for storage or transportation of goods. Plural is Dolia.
Domus
House occupied by the upper classes and some wealthy freedmen during the Republican and Imperial eras.
Dupondius
Brass coin used during the Roman Republic and Roman Empire originally valued at 2 asses or 1/5 of a denarius.

== E ==
Egg-and-dart
An egg-shaped ornament alternating with a dart-like ornament, used to enrich ovolo and echinus moldings. Also called Echinus, Egg-and-anchor, Egg-and-arrow, and egg-and-tongue.
Emblem
Motifs used as floating elements in Greek and Roman wall paintings.
Emblema
Portable mosaic made of fine tesserae on a terracotta or travertine tray for insertion into a floor.
Entablature
A superstructure of moldings and bands which lie horizontally above columns, resting on their capitals.
Epistyle
Lintel or beam that rests on the capitals of columns. Also known as an architrave.
Erotes
Winged deities associated with love and sexual intercourse that are part of Aphrodite's retinue.
Exedra
room featuring a semicircular architectural recess, often crowned by a semi-dome fully open on one side and usually located adjacent to the peristyle.
Exomis
In ancient Greece, a tunic used by the workers and the light infantry. The tunic largely replaced the older chitoniskos (or short chiton) as the main tunic of the hoplites during the later 5th century BCE. In ancient Rome, a Roman sleeveless vest, often worn by slaves or artisans.

== F ==
Facade
An exterior side of a building, usually the front
Familia
Familia originally meant the group of the famuli (the servi or serfs and the slaves of a rural estate) living under the same roof. That meaning later expanded to indicate the familia as the basic Roman social unit, which might include the domus (house or home) but was legally distinct from it: a familia might own one or several homes. All members and properties of a familia were subject to the authority of a pater familias.
Fauces
entrance hall
First Style
Structural, incrustation or masonry style, the most popular Roman interior painting design from 200 BCE until 80 BCE that imitated Hellenistic culture and the Ptolemaic palaces of the Near East. Extremely wealthy Romans inset expensive stone like marble into the walls while the less fortunate had their walls painted to resemble marble. The marble-like look was acquired by the use of stucco moldings, which caused portions of the wall to appear raised. Other simulated elements such as suspended alabaster discs in vertical lines, 'wooden' beams in yellow and 'pillars', 'cornices' in white and the use of vivid color also combined to achieve the effect. Examples of the First Style include the House of the Faun and the House of Sallust in Pompeii.
Forma di pasticceria
A pastry mold, either elliptical or shell-shaped, although recent research reveals these bronze vessels may have been used for personal ablutions and not cooking.
Fourth Style
Characterized as a Baroque reaction to the Third Style's mannerism, the Fourth Style in Roman wall painting (c. 60–79 AD), developed as a consequence of the decoration of Nero's Domus Aurea following the Great Fire of Rome in 64 CE, is generally less ornamented than its predecessor. It revived large-scale narrative painting and panoramic vistas while retaining the architectural details of the Second and First Styles. In the Julio-Claudian phase (c. 20–54 CE), a textile-like quality dominates and tendrils seem to connect all the elements on the wall. The colors warm up once again, and they are used to advantage in the depiction of scenes drawn from mythology, landscapes, and other images. Intricate paintings appeared busier and used the wall in its entirety to be complete.The overall feeling of the walls typically formed a mosaic of framed pictures. The lower zones of these walls tended to be composed of the First Style. Panels were also used with floral designs on the walls. A prime example of the Fourth Style is the Ixion Room in the House of the Vettii in Pompeii.The House of the Prince of Naples is also an example in a more modest structure.
Fresco
mural painting executed upon freshly laid, or wet lime plaster.

== G ==
Garum
Fermented fish sauce used as a condiment in the cuisines of ancient Greece, Rome, Carthage and later Byzantium
Graffito
Deliberate mark made by scratching or engraving on a large surface such as a wall. The marks may form an image or writing.
Grisaille
a painting executed entirely in shades of grey or of another neutral greyish colour

== H ==
Herm
Statue consisting of a four-cornered pillar surmounted by a bust or head, usually that of Hermes, and generally displayed with genitals. Often used as boundary markers, mile-stones sign-posts.
Hermaphroditus
Son of Aphrodite and Hermes with the attributes of both male and female.
Hippocampus
Mythological creature depicted as having the upper body of a horse with the lower body of a fish.
Hortus
Roman Garden. Also known as viridarium/plural viridaria.
Hypostyle
In architecture, a hypostyle hall has a roof which is supported by columns.
Hypocaust
Heating system that circulates hot air below the floor.

== I ==
Impluvium
Sunken part of the atrium in a Greek or Roman house (domus) designed to carry away rainwater coming through the compluvium of the roof.
In situ
In place, on site or in position.
Insula
1. City block in a city plan, i.e. a building area surrounded by four streets.
2. Type of apartment building that occupied a Roman city block usually owned by a single individual.
Insularis
Caretaker of an insula
Intercolumnum
Space between a series of columns. Also called intercolumniation.

== J ==
Jupiter Capitolinus
Temple built for the worship of the divine triad, Jupiter, Juno and Minerva, on hills and other prominent areas in many cities in Italy and the provinces, particularly during the Augustan and Julio-Claudian periods. Most had a triple cella. The earliest known example of a Capitolium outside of Italy was at Emporion (now Empúries, Spain). Although the word Capitolium (pl. Capitolia) could be used to refer to any temple dedicated to the Capitoline Triad, it referred especially to the temple on the Capitoline Hill in Rome known as aedes Iovis Optimi Maximi Capitolini ("Temple of Jupiter Best and Greatest on the Capitoline").
Janus
God of beginnings, gates, transitions, time, duality, doorways, passages, and endings. He is usually depicted as having two faces, since he looks to the future and to the past.

== K ==
Kantharos
Cup used to hold wine, possibly for drinking or for ritual use or offerings. Also spelled cantharos.

== L ==
Lagena
Flask or mug with narrow neck and mouth used by the Romans to contain wine or other liquids.
Lararium
Shrine to the household gods (Lares)
Lares
Household deities in Roman religion that encompassed hero-ancestors, guardians of the hearth, fields, boundaries, or fruitfulness, or an amalgamation of these.
Lesbian cyma
Uppermost molding, of the cornice in the classical order, and made of the s-shaped cyma molding (either cyma recta or cyma reversa), combining a concave cavetto with a convex ovolo. It is characteristic of Ionic columns and can appear as part of the entablature, the epistylium, and the capital. Often decorated with a palmette or egg-and-dart ornament on the surface of the molding.
Lesbian wave
Concave band or strip used in architectural molding.
Libertinus
A freed slave, Libertus (male), Liberta (female).
Lintel
Horizontal block that spans the space between two supports usually over an opening such as a window or door.
Loggia
Covered exterior gallery or corridor usually on an upper level, but sometimes at ground level. The outer wall is open to the elements, usually supported by a series of columns or arches.
Luminello
1. Small votive lamp.
2. Lamp nozzle or flame opening.
Lunette
In architecture, a lunette (French lunette, "little moon") is a half-moon shaped space, either masonry or void. A lunette is formed when a horizontal cornice transects a round-headed arch at the level of the imposts, where the arch springs.

== M ==
Maenad
Female follower of Dionysus (Roman Bacchus)
Metope
Rectangular architectural element that fills the space between two triglyphs in a Doric frieze.
Molding
Decorative finishing strip.

== N ==
Nebris
Skin of a fawn often worn by Dionysus, satyrs, and baccanals.
Negotium
Business activities.
Nereid
Sea nymphs (female spirits of sea waters), the 50 daughters of Nereus and Doris, sisters to their brother Nerites. They often accompany Poseidon, the god of the sea, and can be friendly and helpful to sailors (such as the Argonauts in their search for the Golden Fleece).
Nymph
Supernatural being associated with many other minor female deities that are often associated with the air, seas, woods, water or particular locations or landforms.
Nymphaeum
Structure consecrated to nymphs, especially those of springs, usually containing one or more fountains.

== O ==
Oculus
A circular opening in the center of a dome such as the one in the roof of the Pantheon in Rome or in a wall.
Oecus
Reception room in a Roman domus.
Oleare
An oil can or vessel used to dispense lubricating oil.
Opus caementicium
Concrete used in construction in Ancient Rome; irregular pieces of stone, terracotta or brick used to bind the mortar of concrete. Also called caementum (plural caementa).
Opus incertum
Ancient Roman construction technique, using irregularly shaped and randomly placed uncut stones or fist-sized tuff blocks inserted in a core of opus caementicium.
Opus latericium
Ancient Roman form of construction in which coarse-laid brickwork is used to face a core of opus caementicium.
Opus reticulatum
Form of brickwork used in ancient Roman architecture. It consists of diamond-shaped bricks of tuff, referred to as cubilia, placed around a core of opus caementicium.
Opus sectile
Art technique popularized in the ancient and medieval Roman world where materials were cut and inlaid into walls and floors to make a picture or pattern. Unlike tessellated mosaic techniques, where the placement of very small uniformly sized pieces forms a picture, opus sectile pieces are much larger and can be shaped to define large parts of the design.
Opus signinum
Building material used in ancient Rome. It is made of tiles broken up into very small pieces, mixed with mortar, and then beaten down with a rammer.
Opus tessellatum
Mosaic, made from tesserae that are larger than about 4 mm used for larger areas and laid down at the final site. Opus tessellatum is usually used for backgrounds consisting of horizontally or vertically arranged lines, but not both in a grid, which would be opus regulatum.
Opus vittatum mixtum
Combination of brick and small stone blocks used as the facing of an opus caementicium wall in which one course of block alternates with two courses of brick
Orthostates
Large stone slabs revetting the lower part of the cella of a temple. Also known as orthostat.
Oscillium
Ornaments suspended from the architrave of a peristyle in a Roman house. Plural is Oscilla.
Ostiarius
Porter or doorman; a servant or guard posted at the entrance of a building.
Otium
Leisure including time spent eating, playing, resting, contemplation and engaging in academic endeavors.

== P ==
Palmette
Decorative motif suggestive of a palm leaf.
Patera
Earthenware or metal saucer used by the ancient Romans for drinking and libations at sacrifices, or a round or oval disk or medallion bearing an ornamental design in bas-relief or intaglio and often used in decoration of buildings or furniture.
Pater familias
Oldest living male in a household, who exercises autocratic authority over his extended family.
Patronus
Protector, sponsor, and benefactor of the client in a Roman patron-client relationship.
Penaria
Storeroom or pantry for provisions.
Penates
household deities, invoked most often in domestic rituals associated with Vesta, the Lares, and the Genius of the Pater familias.
Peristyle
Continuous porch of columns surrounding a courtyard or garden (see also Peristasis)
Phiale
Building or columned arcade around a fountain.
Pietas
Duty, religiosity or religious behavior loyalty, or devotion, one of the chief virtues among the ancient Romans.
Pignattino
Small terracotta pot shaped like a pine cone.
Pilaster
Architectural element used to give the appearance of a supporting column and to articulate an extent of wall, with only an ornamental function.
Pinax
1. Painting on a wooden panel, sometimes with shutters.
2. In Pompeiian Fourth Style decor, a painted framed picture painted directly on a wall.
Plebs
General body of free Roman citizens who were not patricians, as determined by the census or, in other words, commoners.
Plinian eruption
Volcanic eruptions marked by their similarity to the eruption of Mount Vesuvius in 79 CE, which destroyed the ancient Roman cities of Herculaneum and Pompeii marked by columns of volcanic debris and hot gases ejected high into the stratosphere and the ejection of large amounts of pumice with very powerful continuous gas-driven eruptions.
Plinth
The base or support on which a statue, obelisk, or column is mounted. A plinth is a lower terminus of the face trim on a door that is thicker and often wider than the trim which it augments. Also called a Pedestal.
Pomerium
Religious boundary around the city of Rome and cities controlled by Rome. In legal terms, Rome existed only within its pomerium; everything beyond it was simply territory (ager) belonging to Rome.
Pluteus
1. Balustrade made up of massive rectangular slabs of wood, stone or metal, which divides part of a building in half
2. Low partition wall or balustrade separating columns.
Porticus
Series of columns or arches creating a covered walkway.
Posticum
Back door to a Roman house.
Praenomen
Personal name or forename chosen by the parents of a Roman child.
Procoe
Terracotta flask or beaker.
Protome
Adornment that takes the form of the head and upper torso of either a human or an animal.
Pudicitia
Modesty, chastity, or sexual virtue, a central concept in ancient Roman sexual ethics.
Punteggiato regolare
Floor pavement with regular punctuations of colored tesselae.
Puteal
Circular stone enclosure, usually surrounding the mouth of a well to prevent people from falling into it.
Pyroclastic flow
Fast-moving current of hot gas and volcanic matter (collectively known as tephra) that moves away from a volcano about 100 km/h (62 mph) on average but is capable of reaching speeds up to 700 km/h (430 mph). The gases can reach temperatures of about 1,000 °C (1,830 °F).
Pyroclastic surge
Flowing mixture of gas and rock fragments ejected during some volcanic eruptions. Pyroclastic surge refers to a specific type of pyroclastic current which moves on the ground as a turbulent flow with low particle concentration (high ratio of gas to rock [1]) with support mainly from the gas phase. Pyroclastic surges are thus more mobile and less confined compared to dense pyroclastic flows, which allows them to override ridges and hills rather than always travel downhill.

== Q ==
Quadriga
Car or chariot drawn by four horses abreast (the Roman Empire's equivalent of Ancient Greek tethrippon.)

== R ==
Revetment
Façade of stone slabs or decorated ceramic plaques used as the outer facing layer of a wall, especially in Ancient Roman architecture.
Rhyton
Horn-shaped, conical, or animal shaped container from which fluids were intended to be drunk or to be poured in some ceremony such as libation, or merely at table.

== S ==
Salutatio
Daily morning reception at the home of a Roman patron where he would receive his clients at dawn in the atrium and tablinum to discuss their needs after which the clients would escort the patron to the forum.
Samnites
Ancient Oscan-speaking tribal peoples of central Italy who first allied with then later warred with the Roman.
Second Style
Roman painting style, or 'illusionism' that dominated the 1st century BCE and retained the marble look of the First Style but incorporated painted walls with faux architectural features and trompe-l'œil ("trick the eye") compositions. Painters wanted to give off the illusion that the viewer was looking through a window at the scenery depicted. They also added objects that are commonly seen in real life such as vases and shelves along with items that appeared to be sticking out of the wall. The style evolved during the reign of Augustus. False architectural elements opened up wide expanses with which to paint artistic compositions. A structure inspired by stage sets developed, whereby one large central tableau is flanked by two smaller ones. One of the most recognized examples is the Dionysiac mystery frieze in the Villa of the Mysteries in Pompeii and the Villa of P. Fannius Synistor at Boscorerale.
Sestertius
Originally, a small silver coin equal to 2 1/2 asses or 1/4 of a denarius. Under Augustus it evolved into a large brass coin equal to 1/100 of a gold aureus.
Silens
Elderly, rustic spirits (daimones) in the train of the god Dionysus. They were sons of the elder Seilenos (Silenus) and the fathers of the tribes of Satyrs and Oreiades (mountain nymphs). Plural is Silenoi.
Sima
Top molding of a pediment placed above its cornice.
Sinopia
Dark reddish-brown natural earth pigment, whose reddish colour comes from hematite, a dehydrated form of iron oxide used on the rough initial layer of plaster for the underdrawing for a fresco. The word came to be used both for the pigment and for the preparatory drawing itself, which may be revealed when a fresco is stripped from its wall for transfer.
Socle
The lowest horizontal course of paint on an interior wall of a Roman house. Originally representing a stone or marble lower course (First Style), the socle was conserved as a decorative element in all subsequent Styles. It sometimes projects from the wall and is used for display or contains compartments for storage. Also called the dado.
Stitch (architecture)
Height from the horizontal plane to the apex of the dome of a barrel vault.
Stola
Long, pleated dress, worn over an undergarment called a tunic or tunica intima, usually sleeveless but versions of it did have short or long sleeves. It was fastened by clasps at the shoulder called fibulae and typically girt with ribbons and two belts. The first was worn just below the breasts creating a great number of folds. The second and wider belt was worn around the waist.
Stucco
Construction material made of aggregates, a binder, and water. Stucco is applied wet and hardens to a very dense solid. It is used as a decorative coating for walls and ceilings, and as a sculptural and artistic material in architecture.

== T ==
Taberna
Retail unit or workshop where economic activities or service industries were provided, including the sale of cooked food, wine and bread. Plural is Tabernae.
Tablinum
Office in a Roman house, where the pater familias would receive his clients. It was originally the master bedroom, but later became the main office and reception room for the house master.
Tainia
1. (Latin taenia; derived from the Ancient Greek ταινία (tainía): "band" or "ribbon") small "fillet" molding near the top of the architrave in a Doric column.
2. Headband, ribbon, or fillet. Sometimes spelled tänie.
Terminus ante quem
In Latin, "limit before which". Used in relative dating, when something can be dated before a certain year often concluded from stratigraphy. If for example wreck A is laying under wreck B (dated), then wreck A is older than the year of wreck B.
Terminus post quem
In Latin, "limit after which". Used in relative dating, when something can be dated after a certain year. This may be the case if datable coins are found in an old shipwreck.
tessera

Tiles, usually formed in the shape of a cube, used in creating a mosaic.
Third Style
An ornate style of Roman interior painting popular around 20–10 BCE that departed from illusionistic devices of the Second Style and, instead, obeyed strict rules of symmetry dictated by the central element, dividing the wall into three horizontal and three to five vertical zones. The vertical zones would be divided up by geometric motifs or bases, or slender columns of foliage hung around candelabra. In this particular style, more wall space is left plainly colored, with no design. When designs were present, they tended to be small, plain pictures or scenes such as a candelabra or fluted appendages. Delicate motifs of birds or semi-fantastical animals appeared in the background. Plants and characteristically Egyptian animals were often introduced, part of the Egyptomania in Roman art after Augustus' defeat of Cleopatra and annexation of Egypt in 30 BCE. These paintings were decorated with delicate linear fantasies, predominantly monochromatic, that replaced the three-dimensional worlds of the Second Style. The Villa of Livia in Prima Porta outside of Rome (c. 30–20 BCE) is considered a good example.
thyrsus
A wand or staff of giant fennel (Ferula communis) and covered with ivy vines and leaves, sometimes wound with taeniae and topped with a pine cone or by a bunch of vine-leaves and grapes or ivy-leaves and berries associated with Dionysus (Roman Bacchus) or his followers.
Titulus pictus

Commercial inscriptions on artifacts such as amphora.
toga
A semicircular cloth, between 12 and 20 feet (3.7 and 6.1 m) in length, draped over the shoulders and around the body; woven from white wool and worn over a tunic.
tondo
A circular work of art, either a painting or a sculpture.
trapezophoros
A marble table support for a large tabletop that probably stood in the atrium of a Roman house. Typical carvings include vegetal designs similar to those seen on public monuments of the Augustan age between torsoes of winged griffins. See also cartibulum.
triclinium

A formal dining room in a Roman house that usually contained three couches sized to accommodate diners who reclined on their left side on cushions while served by household slaves.
trompe-l'œil
French for "trick the eye". An art technique that uses realistic imagery to create the optical illusion that the depicted objects exist in three dimensions.
tuff

Rock made of volcanic ash ejected from a vent during a volcanic eruption.
tympanum
1. The triangular or segmental space enclosed by a pediment or arch.
2. Any space similarly marked off or bounded, as above a window, or between the lintel of a door and the arch above.

== U ==
unguentarium

A small container for oil made of metal, ceramic, or glass, though it is also suited for storing and dispensing liquid and powdered substances.
ustrinum

The public site within a necropolis where dead bodies were burned.

== V ==
Veduta
Highly detailed, usually large-scale painting or, more often, print of a cityscape or some other vista. The painters of vedute (plural) are referred to as vedutisti.
Viridarium
Roman gardens. Plural is viridaria. Also known as hortus.
Virtus
Valor, manliness, excellence, courage, character, and worth, perceived as masculine strengths in ancient Rome.
Volute
A spiral, scroll-like ornament that forms the basis of the Ionic order.

== X ==
Xenium
1. Gift of fine food offered to a guest upon arrival. Plural is xenia.
2. Painting representing such food.

== Y ==
There is no word/s.

== Z ==
Zotheca
Alcove with a lowered ceiling for maximum privacy usually found in a cubiculum.

== See also ==
- Glossary of ancient Roman religion
