= Opus mixtum =

Combination of Roman construction techniques

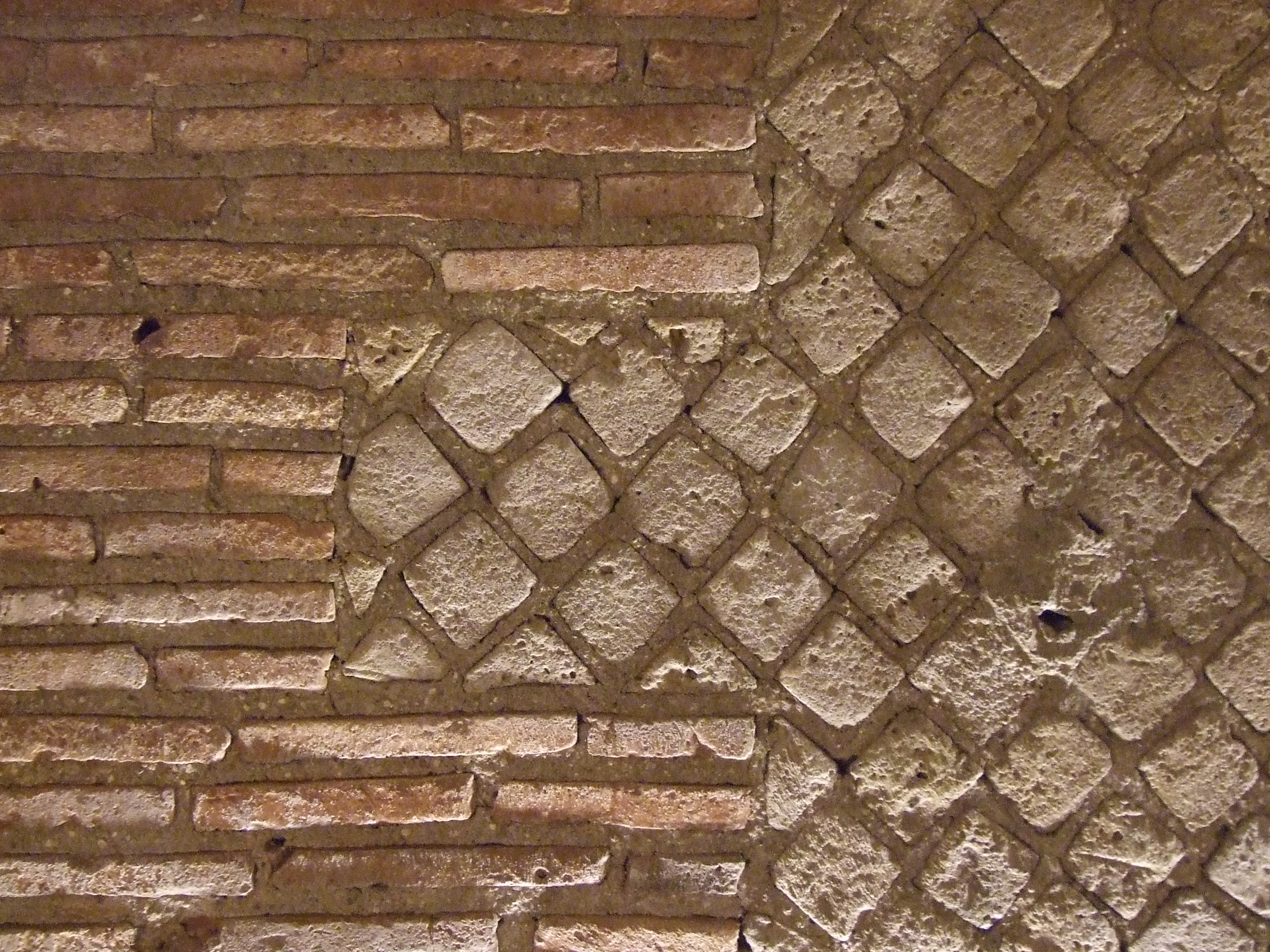
Example of opus mixtum comprising opus reticulatum edged with opus latericium in the Roman theatre, Naples, Italy

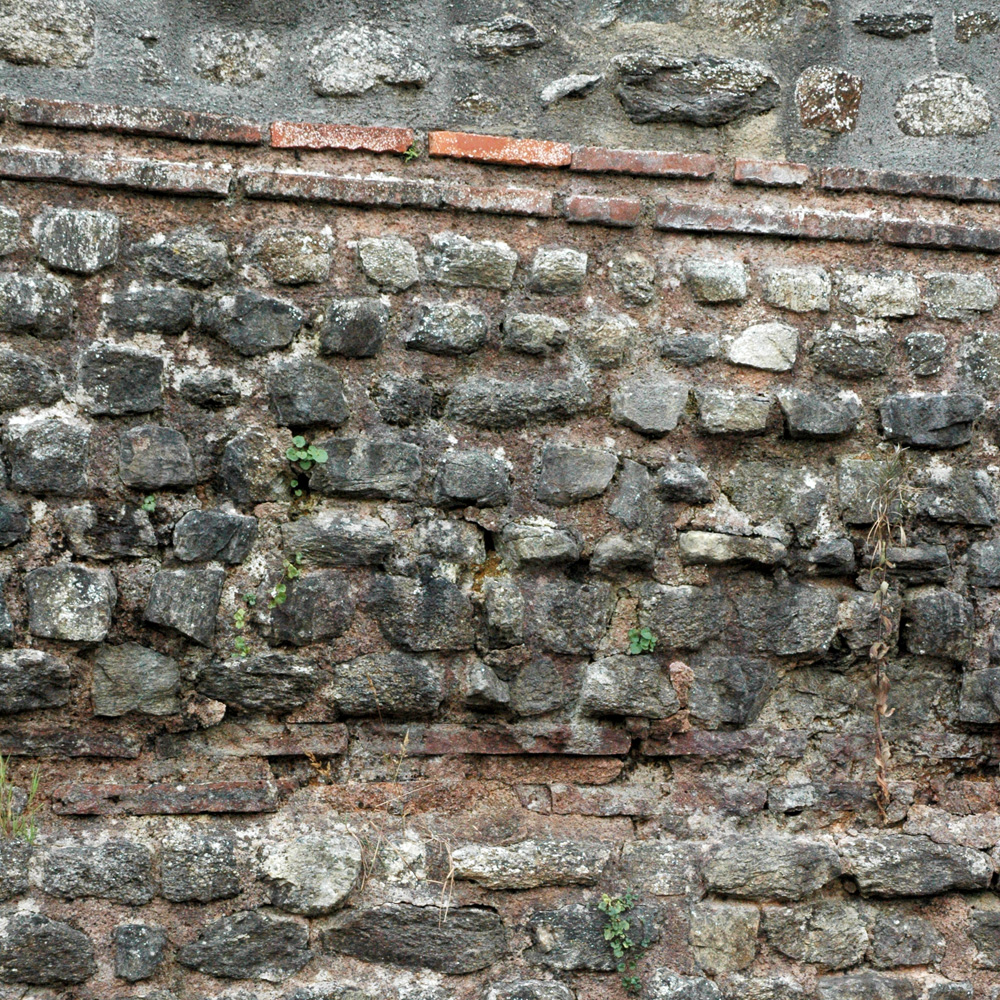
Example of opus mixtum in the substruction of Brest Castle, France

Opus mixtum (Latin: "mixed work"), or opus vagecum and opus compositum, was an ancient Roman construction technique. It can consist in a mix of opus reticulatum and at the angles and the sides of opus latericium. It can also consist of opus vittatum and opus testaceum. This masonry was used in the edges, so as to strengthen the side wall and contrasting the possible cracks along the oblique lines. Often used during the Flavians (from 70CE), under Trajan (98–117) and Hadrian (117–138).

== See also ==
- Roman masonry – building techniques in ancient Rome
- Jublains archeological site – the forum there is an example
