= House of the Cascade =

Coordinates: 37°3′23.8″N 10°3′43.9″E

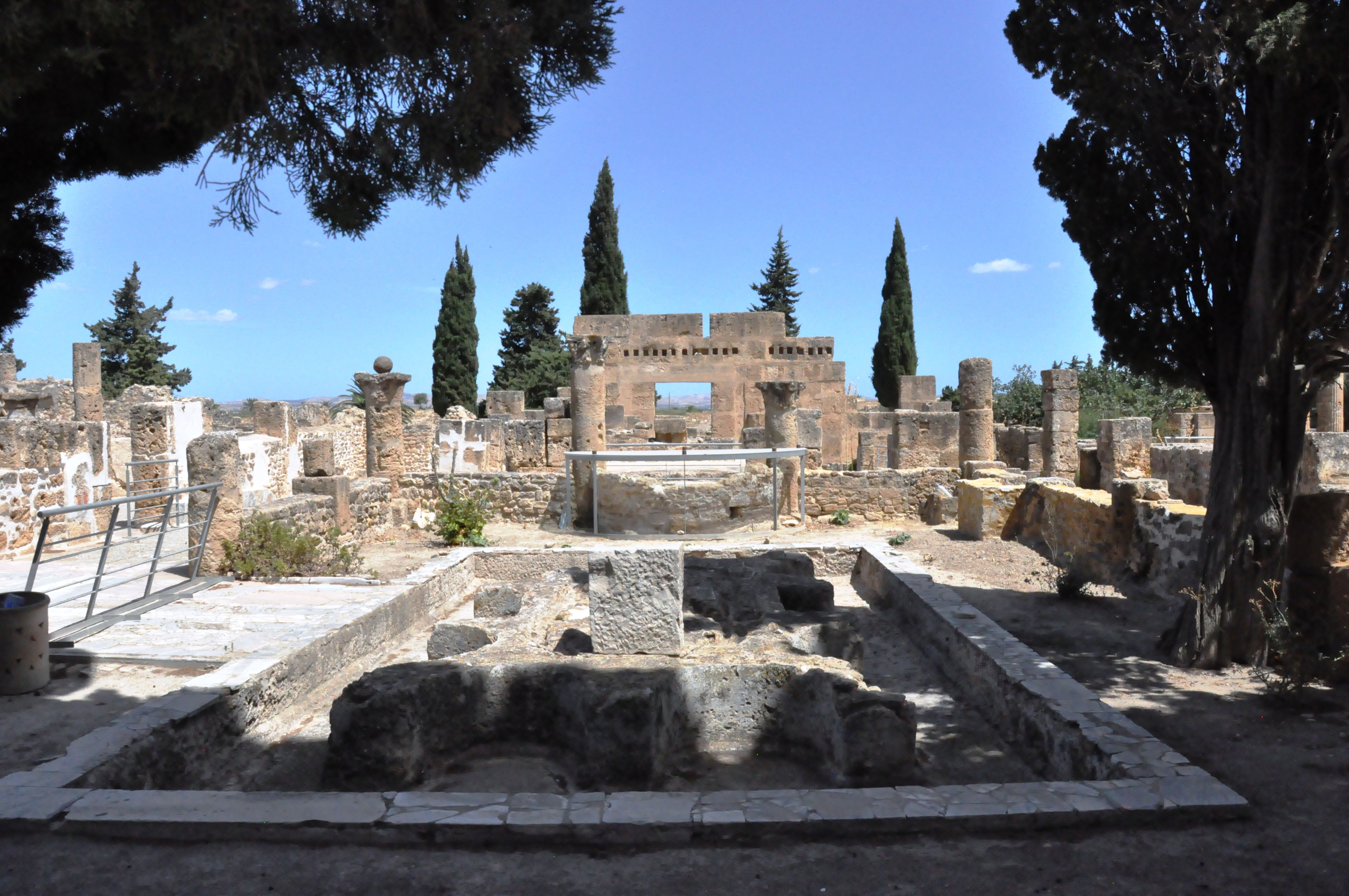
The peristyle of the ruined House

The House of the Cascade is a Roman-era building located in Utica, Tunisia. It is typical of most of the Roman houses excavated to date in North Africa in that it looks inwards to a central courtyard around which the majority of the rooms are arranged. Two smaller courtyard gardens in the western part of the house provided additional light and air.

In other respects the house presents some unique aspects. It is one of the earliest town houses from the Roman period hitherto excavated in North Africa. Likewise the figurative mosaic with the fish mosaic in the cascade pool (itself unique) predates others with similar motifs in North Africa by at least a century. Finally, the ‘skewed’ articulation of the pavement in the large triclinium (apparently designed to maximise the view to the central courtyard and garden for the most important dinner guest), seems to be a unique feature.

The excavations performed of the house gives us valuable insight into the development of urbanisation at Utica as well as the domestic architecture and evolution of mosaics in Roman Tunisia. Although the majority of the pavements at the house lack the vivid colours and imaginative designs of the mosaics exhibited (e. g. the Bardo National Museum in Tunis), this is made up for by their unusual variety and overall good state of preservation.

There are several themes running through the design of the house and its embellishment. One is the importance of the internal view (since the house lies in the centre of the town there would be little or no external view). From the main entrance in the north the passer-by would get a glimpse of a decorative pool (possibly adorned with a fountain and sculpture) located directly inside the vestibule. Other views were available to those chosen few who were allowed to pass through the corridor and into the central courtyard with its garden and decorative fountain. The architect who designed the main triclinium used framing columns and other devices so as to maximise the impact of the view of the central fountain and thus increase the enjoyment of the owner and his guests while they dined. Also the second main reception room (oecus) had a commanding view of the garden and pool.

The second theme governing the architecture and decoration is the allusion to public buildings. Columns, associated with temples and theatres, are used to support the portico round the central garden and in the smaller internal courtyards. There is some evidence that marble revetment, another reference to public spaces, was used to clothe the walls of the reception rooms. Although there is uncertainty in the positioning of the sculptures found at the House of the Cascade, these also allude to public spaces. They seem to have been selected with a view to self-aggrandisement, emphasising the fact that the owner was ‘a man of the world’, well versed in what was the latest fashion in the garden of a man of standing.

Living water, as used in fountains and pools, also plays an important role in the decoration of the house. The refreshing sight and sound of the splashing fountains and cascades and the luxuriant gardens must have provided a welcome relief from the heat of the Tunisian summer.

The aquatic element is also important in the thematic content of the figurative mosaics with imagery drawn from scenes of fishing and sea creatures. While depictions of fish were common in the iconography of the early Church and appear in the mosaics of basilica from the 5th and 6th centuries, it is likely that their choice at the House of the Cascade had a more prosaic reason. I contend that the designs were selected with a view to propitiating the Gods and in the hope of bringing bountiful catches as well as for their decorative appeal.

The architecture and decoration of the house allow its articulation into areas open to the public, reserved for distinguished guests, or open only to the owner and his immediate family. Utilitarian pavement in opus figlinum, simple opus tessellatum or opus lithostroton were utilised for service areas or corridors. More private rooms were generally paved with black and white geometric mosaics with a limited amount of polychromy. The most expensive pavements are those in opus sectile and polychrome figurative opus tessellatum, used in reception rooms and decorative fountain pools respectively.

It is unknown whether the owner received clients for dispensation of gifts and to receive their salutations. If so, then the large corridor just inside the vestibule, adorned with a fountain pool, could have been the site for such a ceremony. The small rooms adjoining the courtyard would have been suitable for the storage of gifts. This zone thus replaces the atrium of contemporary houses on the mainland. The privacy of the peristyle area would not be disturbed - along with the large reception rooms this area was then reserved for the more important guests. However, the house also included private areas reserved for the owner and his family, a shop as well as rented accommodation and servants' quarters. In this ability to combine a multitude of different functions in a relatively small house, the Roman architect responsible for houses like the House of the Cascade showed an imagination and degree of practicality not exceeded even by the sumptuous houses of the Renaissance or indeed of the present day.

Lacking written evidence we can only guess at the identity of the various owners of the house during the 400 years or so of Roman occupation. The size of the house and its architecture tell us that the owners were men of a certain status. Based on the similarity of its design and decoration to other Roman houses both on the mainland and elsewhere in North Africa we can surmise that the owner was well-travelled. Moreover, the references to the sea in the figurative mosaics suggest that the owner was possibly connected with the fish trade, for examples a fish exporter. Probably during the latter part of the period the house was occupied by a public official who received supplicants in the reception room (oecus) with its raised dais. Christianity had spread to Utica in the 3rd century and there is some speculative evidence that the owner was a church dignitary. Whether he combined this role with commercial ventures is not known.
