= Opus reticulatum =

Roman masonry in diamond-shaped bricks of tuff, covering a core of opus caementicium

- Concrete facing
- {{{other_names}}}
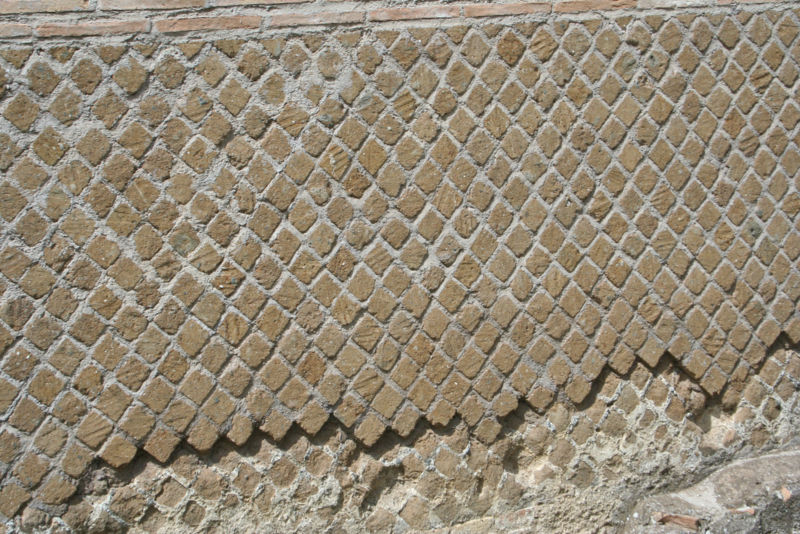
- Opus reticulatum at Hadrian's Villa in Tivoli, Italy
- Features: Net like pattern
- Surface: Tuff, opus caementicium

Opus reticulatum (also known as reticulate work) is a facing used for concrete walls in Roman architecture from about the first century BCE to the early first century CE. (Note: Facings are a type of polygonal masonry used to apply a smooth finish to an opus caementicium’s core.) They were built using small pyramid-shaped tuff, a volcanic stone embedded into a concrete core. Reticulate work was also combined with a multitude of other building materials to provide polychrome colouring and other facings to form new techniques. Opus reticulatum was generally used in central and southern Italy with the exception being its rare appearance in Africa and Jericho. This was because of tuff's wider availability and ease of local transport in central Italy and Campania compared to other regions.

Reticulate work developed in response to the advent of opus caementicium and its predecessor, opus incertum. This was to accommodate both the new building material and the growing demands of urbanisation in Rome through the creation of opus reticulatum, a method more uniform and accessible to unskilled labourers. The need for quicker and easier techniques led to a decline in popularity allowing for the rise of brickwork as a more convenient alternative, especially after the Great Fire of 64 CE.

Opus reticulatum is important for understanding the choices the Romans made with their architecture while keeping in mind the architectural restraints and changes in their circumstances. Reticulate work can also provide evidence of cross-cultural exchange between Rome and its correspondents through its usage outside of central and southern Italy. Further, a written account from Vitruvius shows a Roman opinion on opus reticulatum and its significance in Roman culture. Along with other facings, the technique is also important for dating buildings in modern scholarship where there is an absence in explicit evidence to date the construction.

== Construction and use ==
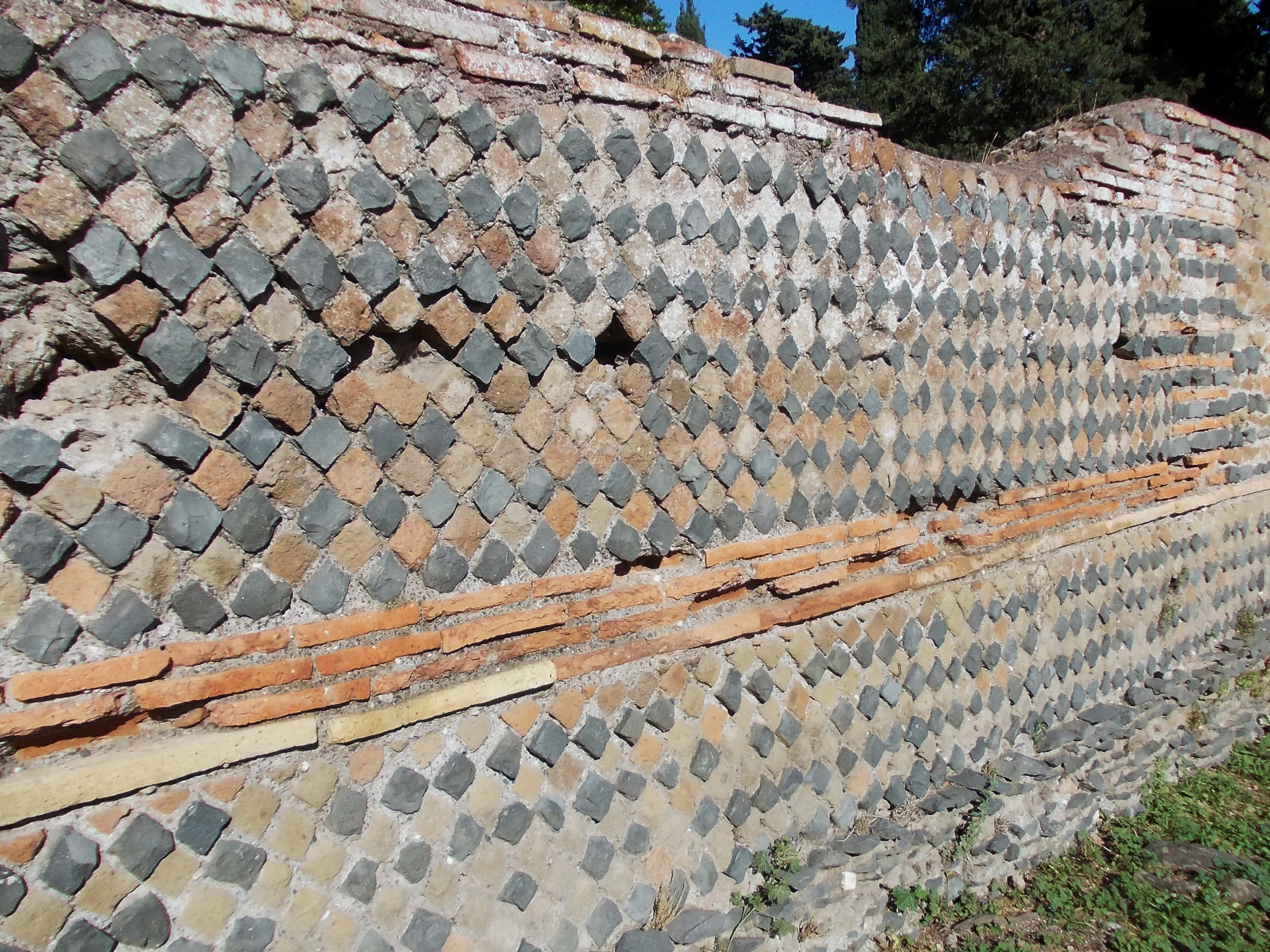
Opus reticulatum with polychrome colouring and brickwork, Ostia Antica, Italy

Opus reticulatum was built through laying a repetitive sequence opus caementicium, caementa and small pyramid shaped tuff to form a net-like pattern. (Note: Caementa are stones or ceramic materials laid into an opus caementicium core to provide it formwork.) The uniform shape of the stones allowed for easy assemblage which Rome used to delegate work to unpaid labour with little training to construct architecture using the facing. The technique provided a greater focus on shifting the workload to preparation and concrete making. The use of opus reticulatum followed utilitarian characteristics common with Roman architecture where they prioritised both practical and aesthetic sensibilities to build their constructions.

Reticulate work was typically used for a variety of architecture including walls, aqueducts among other works. They could be easily stylised with a multitude of material including limestone, lava, and bricks to produce polychrome colouring. Other facings could also be used to form opus mixtum. This was because opus reticulatum’s reliance on uniform tuff blocks meant customisation was easily achieved. The Romans produced lines, complex, figures and letter which were covered with a veneer particularly in Rome during the Augustus’s reign. Such a covering was possibly a later addition or a request from the commissioner according to Jean Pierre Adam. However, Fikret Yegül and Diane Favro do suggest they were always intended to be covered with a decorative veneer which would then be patterned and painted even replicating expensive marble. With Roman craftsmen developing an interest to show uncovered polychromatic colouring at the start of the Augustan period where diverse usage of building materials emerged.

== Material ==
While opus reticulatum used tuff to face opus caementicium core, Roman architects did not use the same tuff throughout their history changing which ones they used depending on their strength. Reticulate work used Tufo Lionato, a tawny orange coloured tuff from the Aniene River. This stone has been cited by Marie Jackson and Fabrizio Marra as having perfected opus reticulatum and opus mixtum during the height of its use. Another tuff used was peperino, a dark grey coloured stone used from the end of the second century BCE.

== Location ==
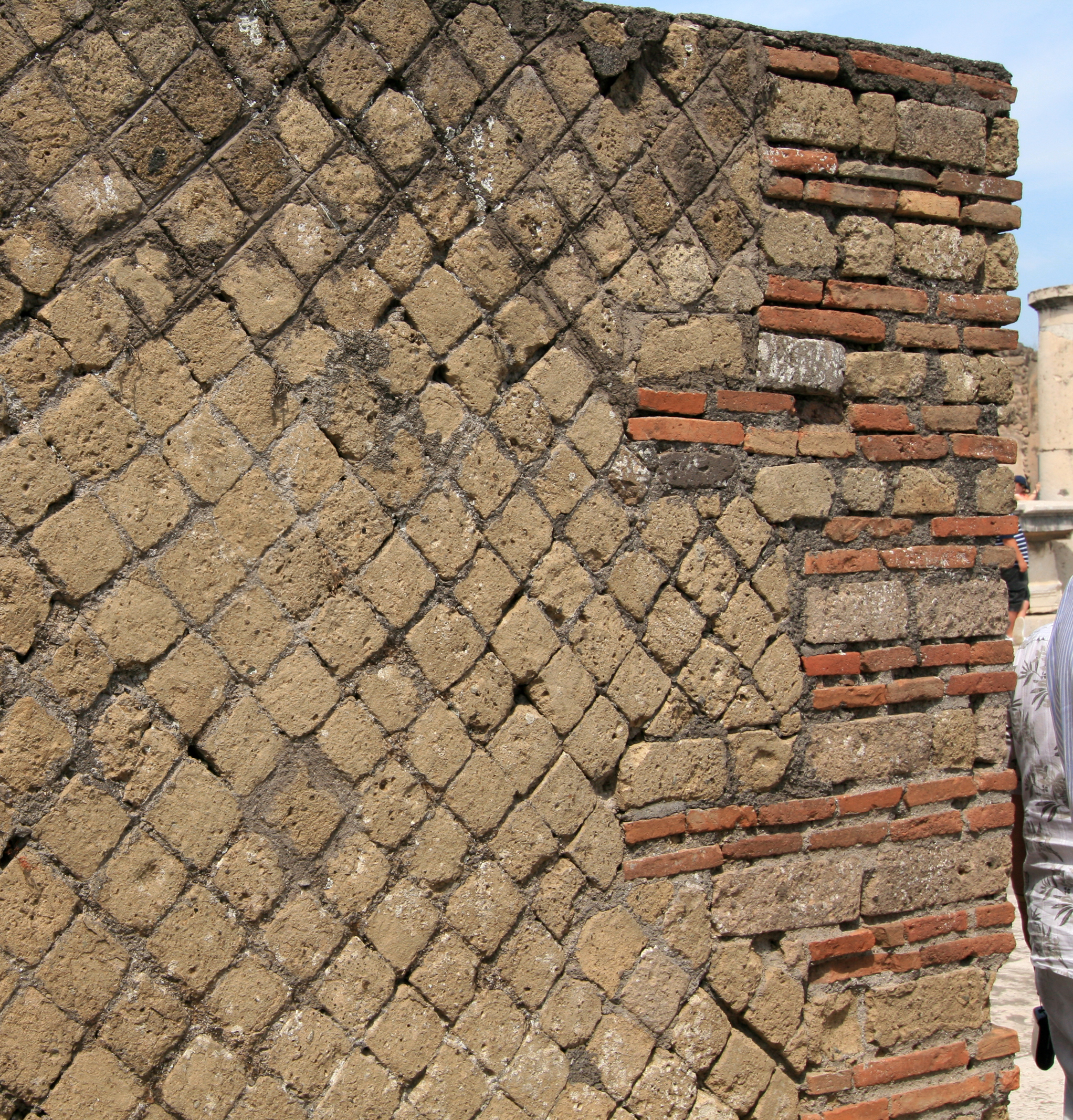
Opus reticulatum in Pompeii

The architectural technique was typically found in central and southern Italy. This is because tuff is predominant in such areas because of their volcanic environment. Further, they also lacked smooth stones like limestone or marble and instead had to rely on volcanic stones for their architecture. The Romans tend not to change core building materials of the places they conquered but rather adapted and used what was readily available to them. This is evident with other techniques such as opus vittatum which used limestone and tuff was localised to central and northern Italy particularly because of the existence of the former in the region.

The Romans did this for practical reasons as building products like stone were difficult to transport long distances because of their weight and had to be partially cut to decrease weight before being sent to the construction site. This was not the case for tuff, which could be easily transported and used throughout central Italy and Campania where it became a common building stone.

While opus reticulatum was typically found in central and southern Italy, the technique had rare appearances in Africa forming another facing called opus africanum. The technique used vertical stone piers filled with rubble mortar which was then faced with unshaped stones, rectangular blocks, or opus reticulatum. A notable example includes a building in Bulla Regia, a Roman town in modern-day Jendouba, Tunisia.

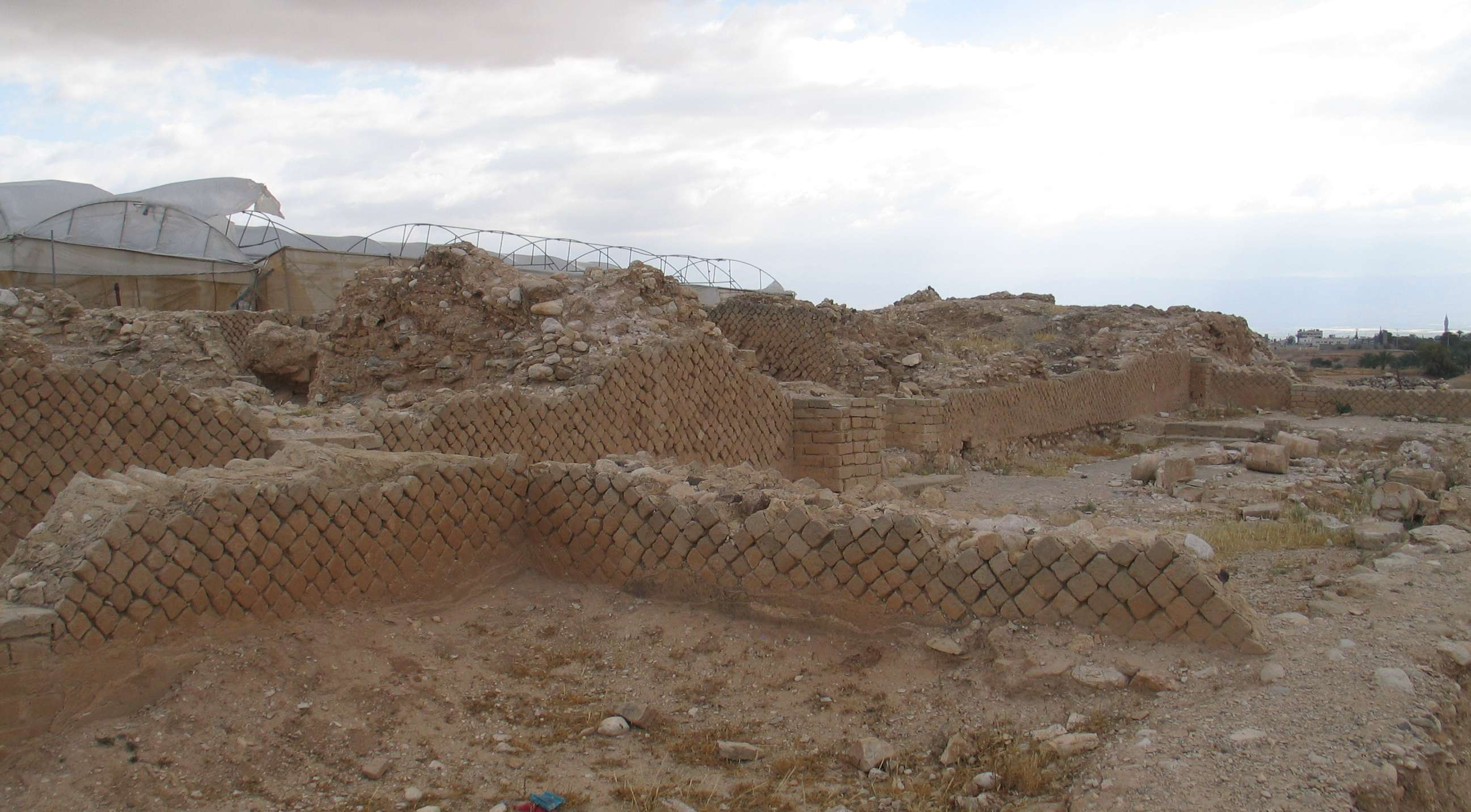
Opus reticulatum at Herod's winter palace, Jericho

Another use of reticulate work outside of Italy was the client king, Herod's winter palace in Jericho. This was among some of the many techniques used for his architectural projects during the late first century BCE.

== Development ==
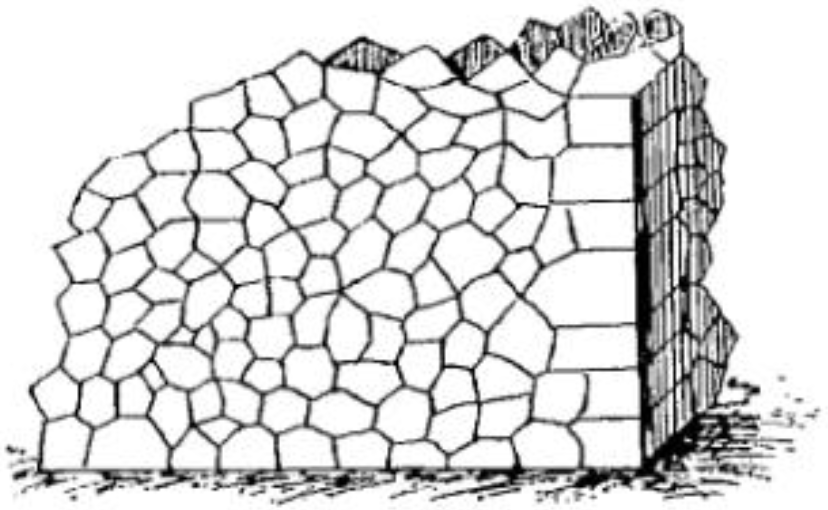
Drawing of opus incertum

=== Rise ===
Around the early second century BCE, opus caementicium was a major innovation for Roman architecture which would eventually become the cornerstone for Roman architecture. This was a result of its high malleability being able to occupy both solid and fluid states which had not been seen previously especially with their history of stone masonry. Further, concrete was quick to dry making construction faster. Such benefits allowed for opus caementicium by the first century BCE to be capitalised upon by Roman magistrates for urban development for lower costs and efficiency.

Opus incertum was the predecessor of opus reticulatum, a facing of uneven shaped tuff used to apply a smooth finish to concrete work allowing for a more distinctive architectural style. This technique mostly disappeared by the late first century to accommodate for the growing architectural needs after the Social War and Civil War. Such pressures lead to the development of more uniform facings namely opus quasi-reticulatum, an architectural technique like opus reticulatum but more irregular in shape. The former went out of style with the advent of reticulate work which employed more even shaped tuff.

=== Popularity ===
Opus reticulatum was created as a response to the growing demands of urbanisation, its pyramid shape was easy to assemble and required little training for unpaid labour to complete compared to the more uneven opus incertum. It became the more popular facing from 100 BCE onwards remaining as such by Vitruvius's time until the early Empire during the second century CE. Craftsmen during the Augustan period refined their skills using opus reticulatum incorporating polychromatic colouring into their work to enhance the aesthetic appearance of facing. Opus reticulatum was perfected with the creation of the Theatre of Pompey in Rome cited by scholars as the first true usage of reticulate work. They also combined the technique with other facings to produce opus mixtum which co-existed with reticulate work until the arrival of opus testaeceum.

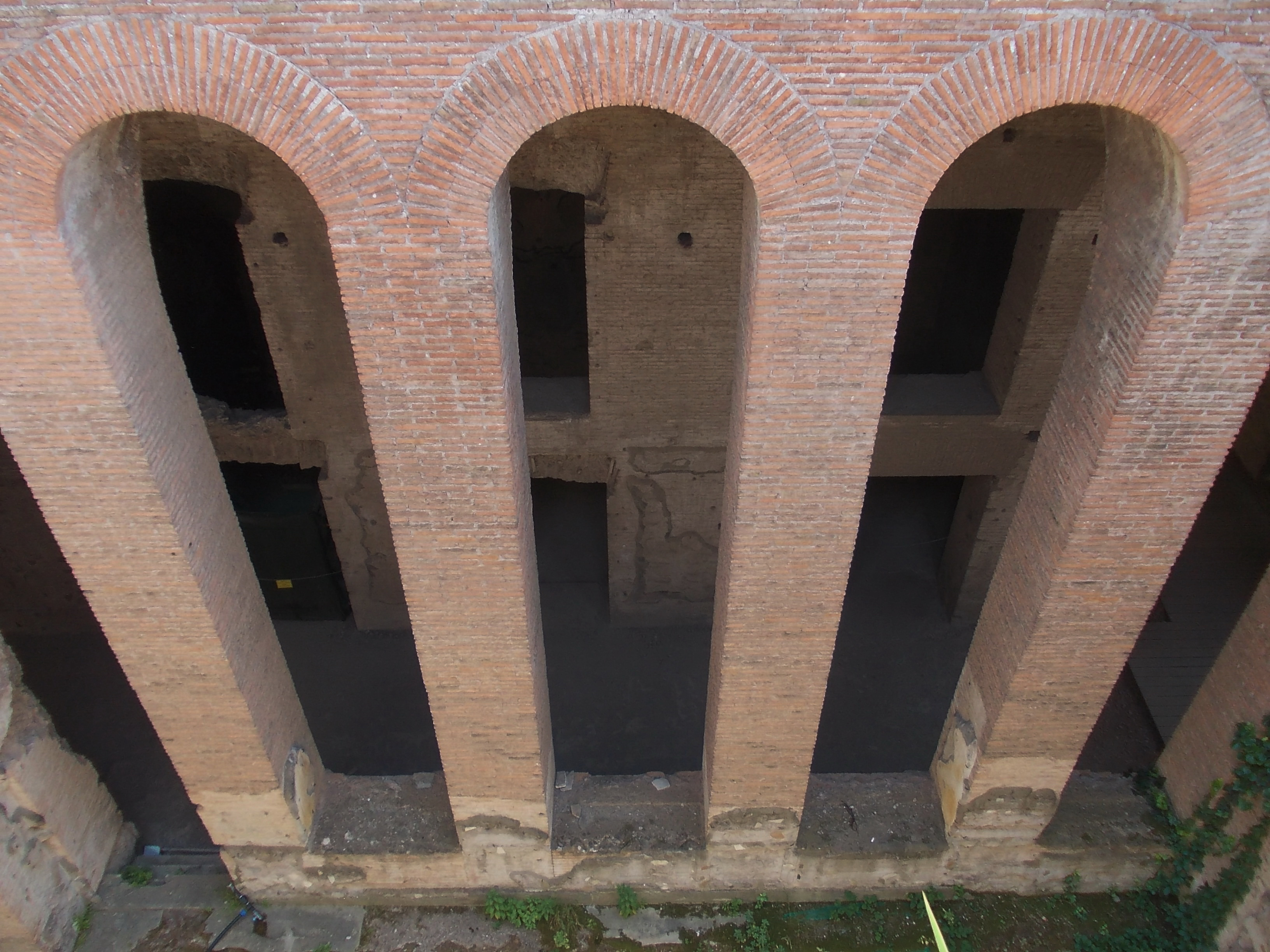
Opus testaceum, successor of opus reticulatum

=== Decline ===
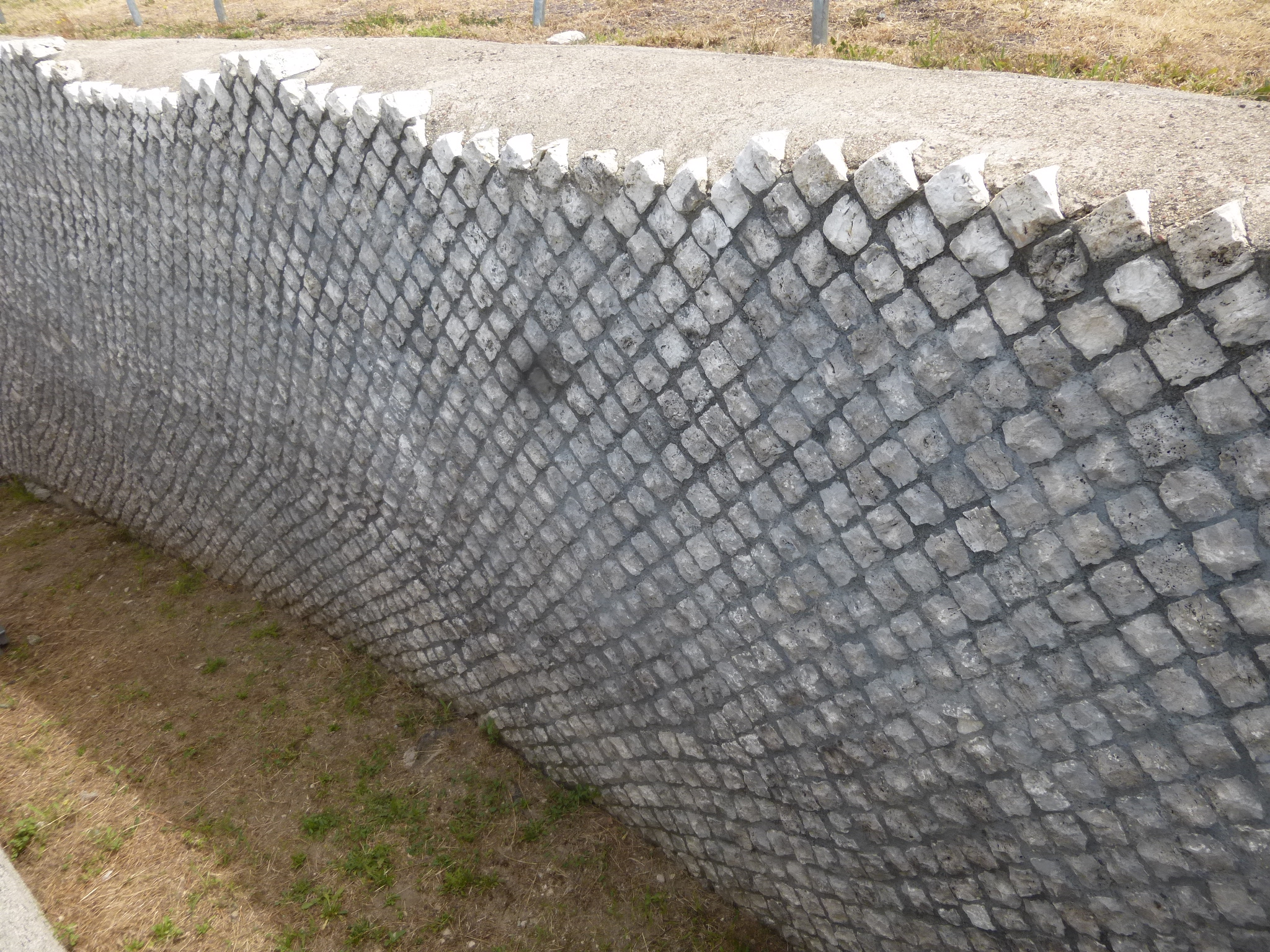
Speculated final use of opus reticulatum in Hadrian's Villa, Tivoli

The popularity of reticulate work eventually waned during the early imperial period especially after the Great Fire of 64 CE which brought about many architectural changes. It experienced a brief revival during the Hadrianic and Antonine period in the second century CE before dying out entirely. During Hadrian's reign opus reticulatum was used with brick as opus mixtum. Pierre-Adam speculates the final usage of opus reticulatum was the Phlegrean Baths and a complex in Hadrian's Villa in Tivoli.

Opus reticulatum’s downfall was caused by the technique's weaknesses and the increased pressures from Rome to further streamline the construction process while maintaining their image. Reticulate work required the use of quoins for its edges usually made of brick or stone because it could not do on its own. The technique and tuff related constructions also suffered from erosion as most stones were exposed to the elements which were liable to absorb moisture and condensation. This was compounded by the tuff used only being moderately lithified and the lower weight bearing compared to other building materials.

Such issues led to the rise of opus testaeceum, a facing using brick which was seen as more effective because it fulfilled Rome's priorities of efficiency and ease or assembly. Brick work also provided the same customisation opus reticulatum did because of the different available colouration of bricks. The technique worked well with opus caementicium and did not require the use of quoins for its edges compared to opus reticulatum.

== Importance ==
=== Ancient ===
Opus reticulatum is important in contributing to the understanding of Rome's urbanisation and their need to streamline the process of construction because of the socio-economic evolution it underwent from the third century BCE. While still accommodating the environmental and architectural constraints of their territories because of their differing landscapes compared to Italy.

Further, opus reticulatum’s use in other locations outside of central and southern Italy is evidence of cultural exchange through the adoption of Roman architecture and techniques. Opus reticulatum was utilised for a variety of reasons including as a means of “conciliation as a display of power” according to Pierre-Adam. Rome used architecture for all intents and purposes as a show of the power of their identity. This can also be applied to foreign figures such as Herod who imported many Roman architectural methods including opus reticulatum as a means of appreciation for Roman culture and politics. The client king also had a relationship with Agrippa displaying a manifestation of cross-cultural bonds and sharing of material culture. Opus reticulatum served to convey to the general populace through architecture larger political and cultural relationships between Rome and its allies.

Vitruvius's De Architectura also provides importance to opus reticulatum by offering an opinion from a Roman architect about the facing and its reception. As he notes the popularity of opus reticulatum while mentioning opus incertum as co-existing with the former. The chronology of the usage of facings is fluid with techniques being used long after their popularity has waned. Vitruvius also criticises reticulate work for being easier to crack at the joints but scholars like Frank Sear tend to chalk up the comment up to his conservatism. As Vitruvius tends to be reluctant to acknowledge architectural advancements especially regarding concrete notably trabeated structures were evolving during the Late Republic but were left unmentioned in De Architectura.

=== Modern ===
The technique also provides the ability to estimate dates for architectural structures where explicit source for its dating does not exist for the construction. This is due to the somewhat chronological order facing techniques are developed in. Reticulate work can also be used for the basis of scholarly debate in particular Edmund Thomas's discussion on the date of the ‘Villa Claudia’ at Anguillara Sabazia. The usage of opus reticulatum in such arguments can also contextualise other architectural features which co-existed with the technique.

== Gallery ==
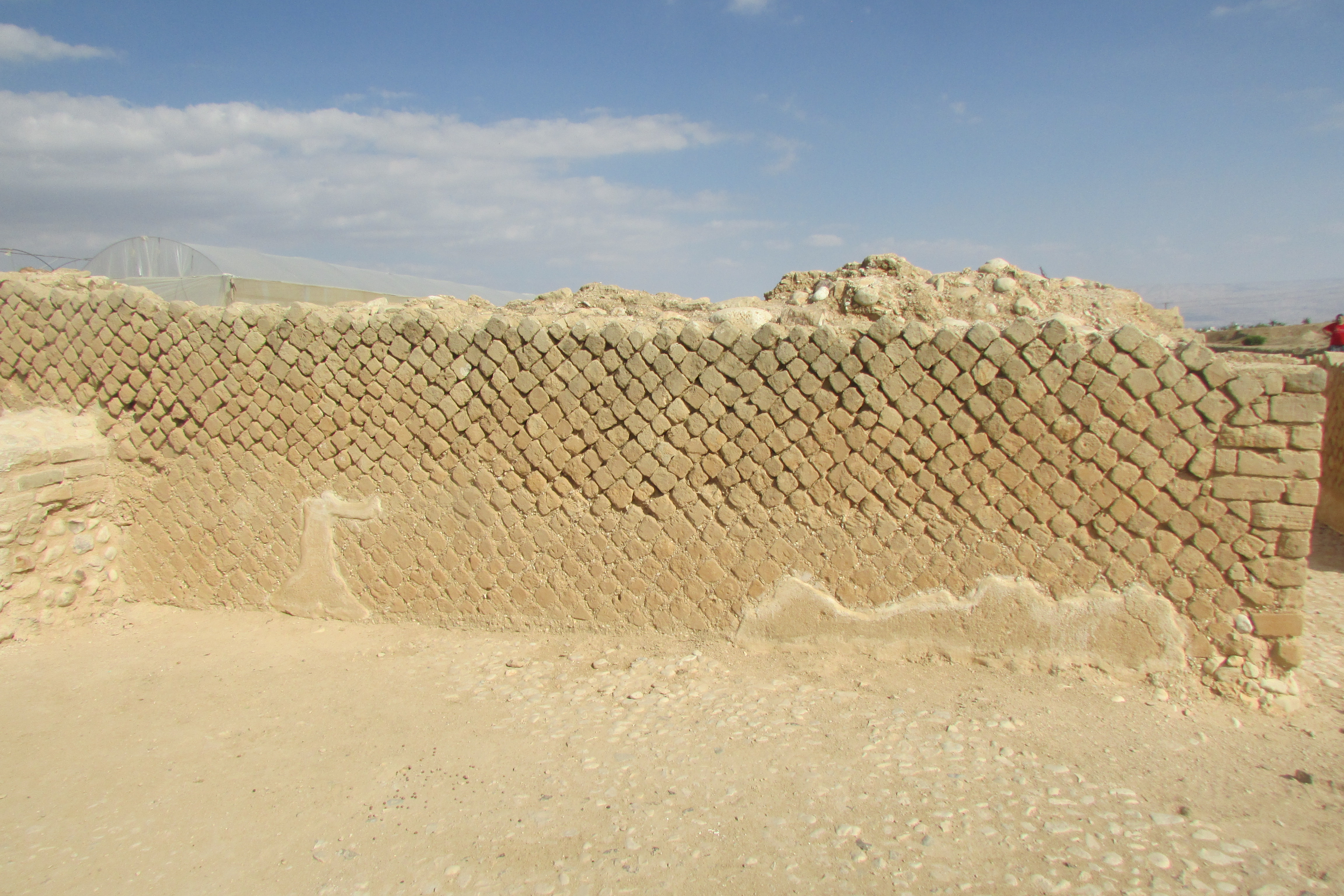

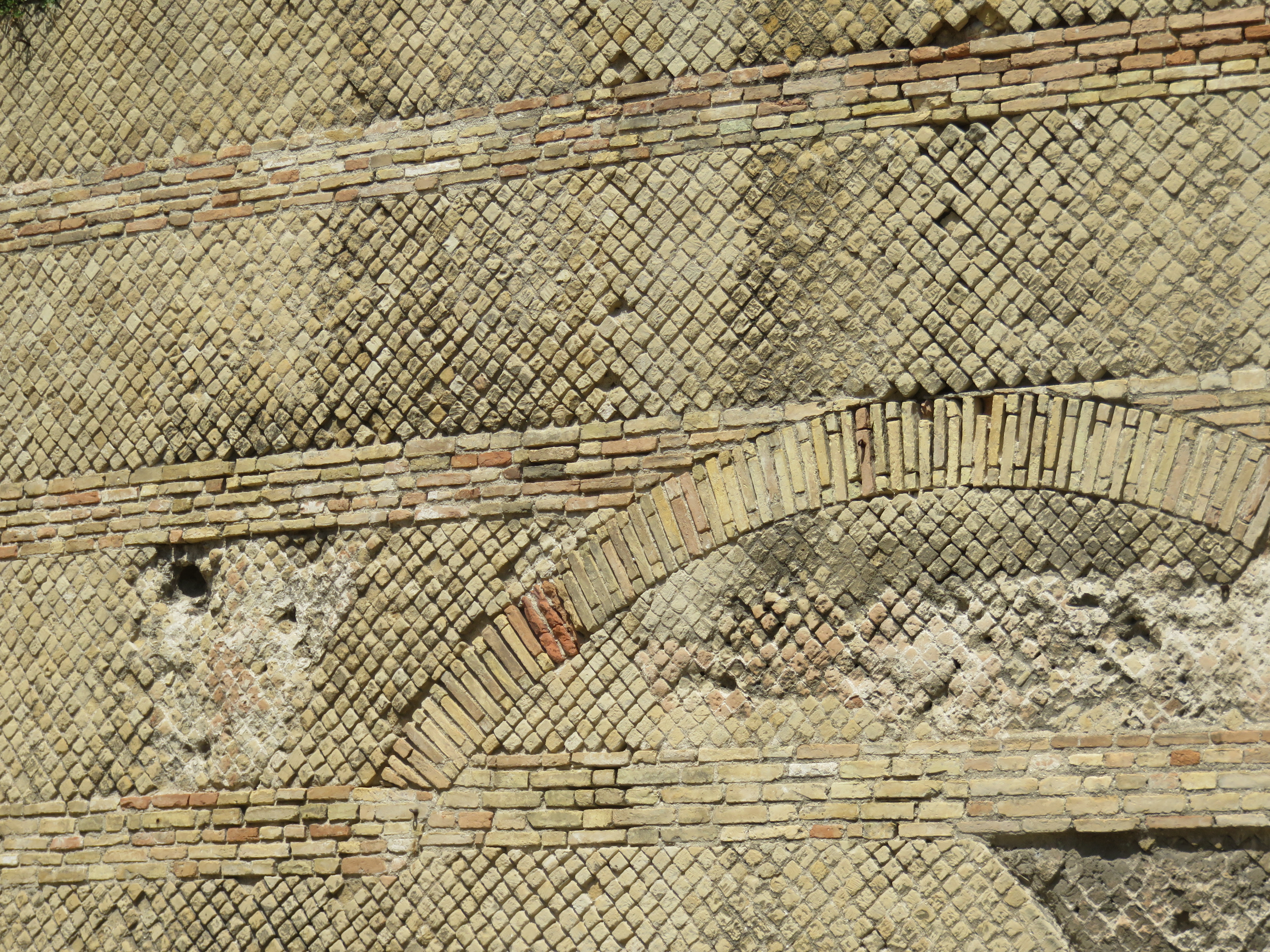

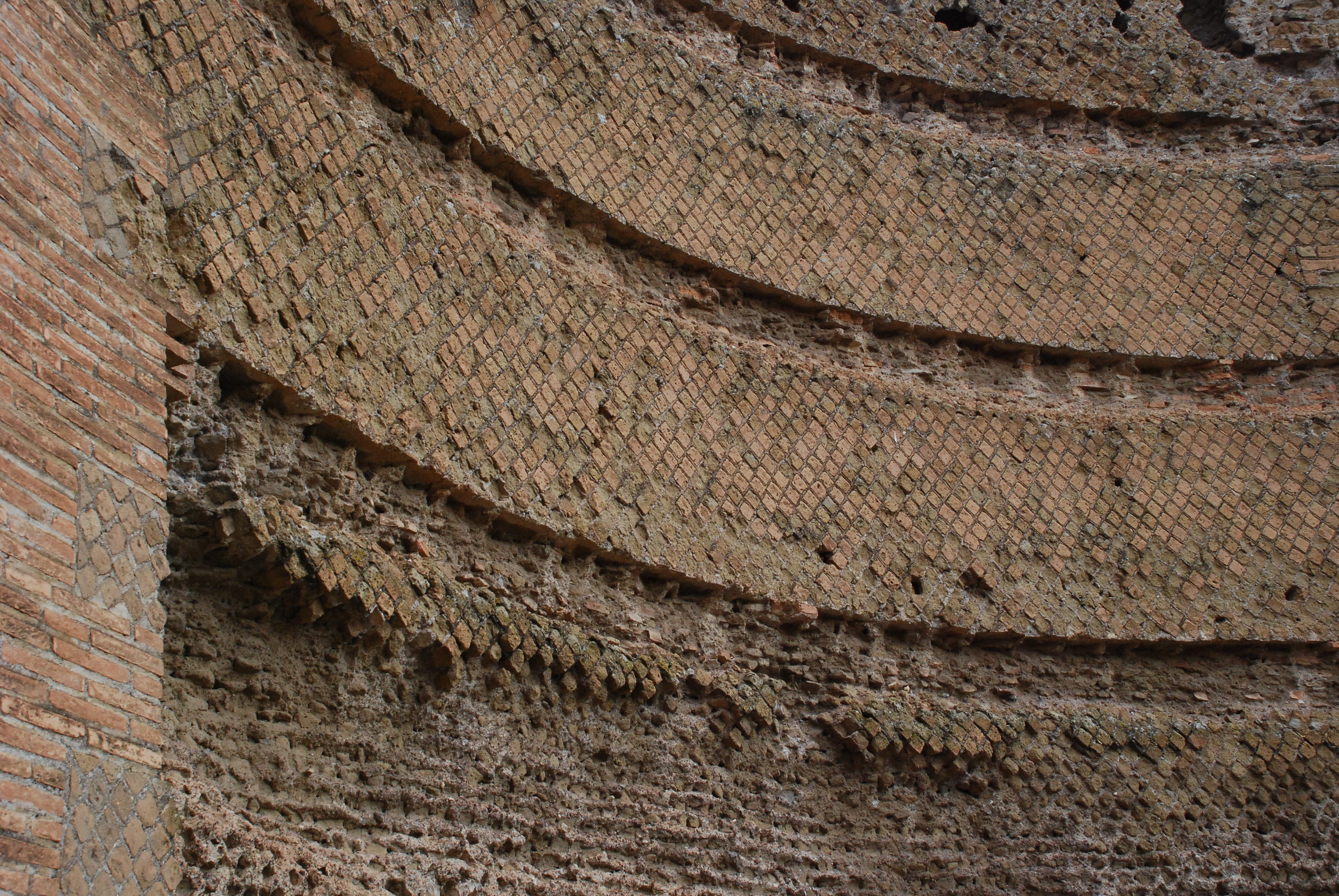
Portion of a wall found near Hadrian's Villa

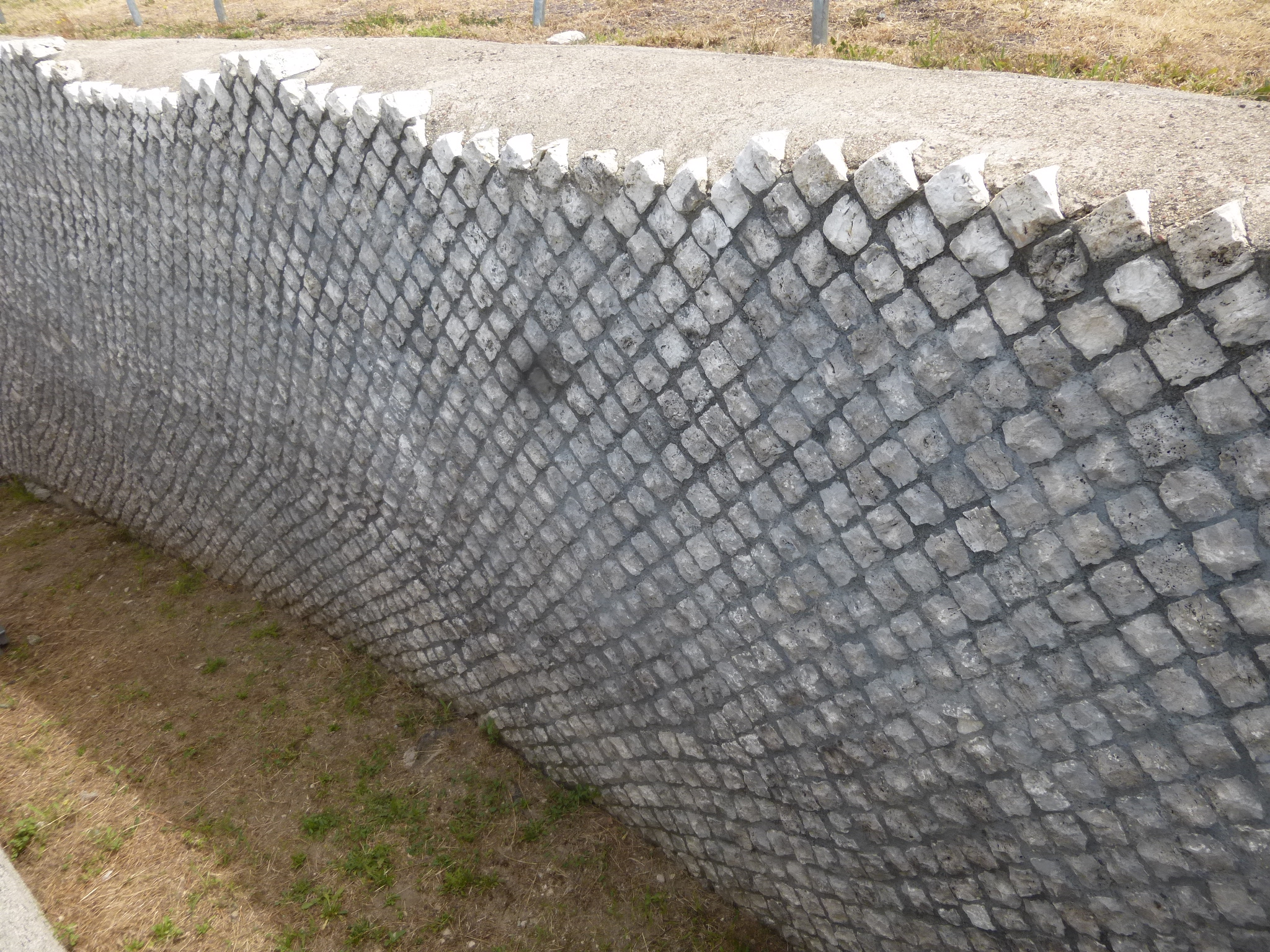
Wall at Tivoli

== See also ==
- Roman masonry – building techniques in ancient Rome
- Roman concrete, also known as Opus caementicium – Building material used in ancient Rome
