= Jettying =

Medieval building technique

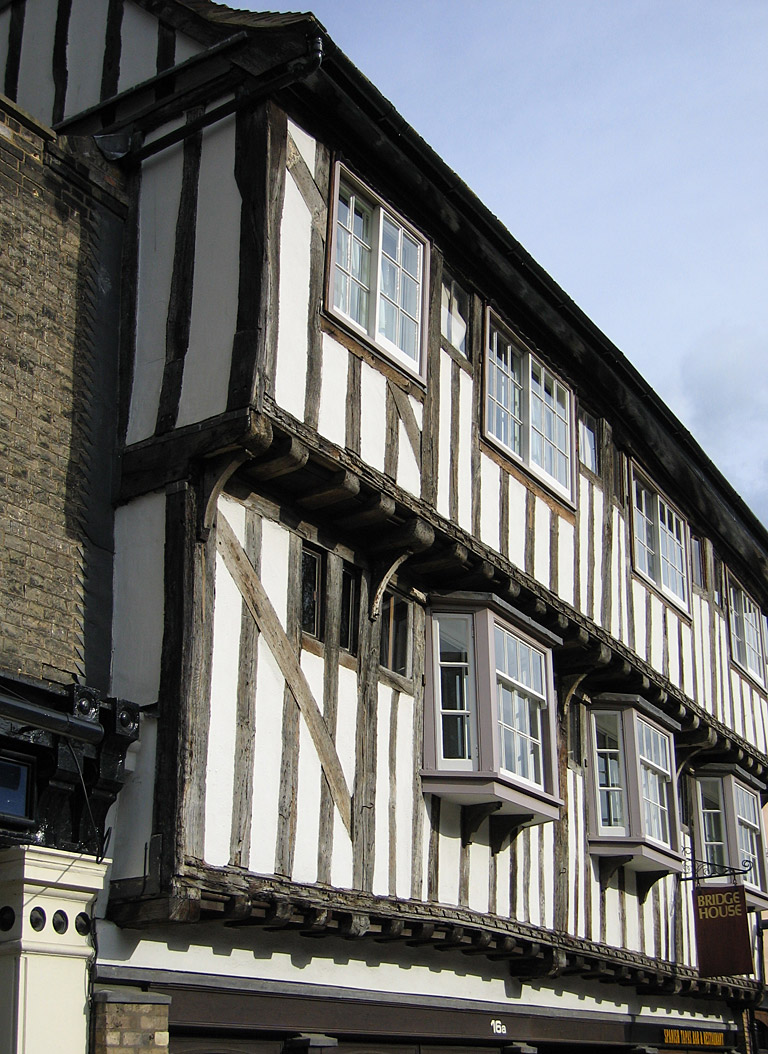
A double jettied timber-framed building. The ends of the multiple cantilevered joists supporting the upper floors can easily be seen.

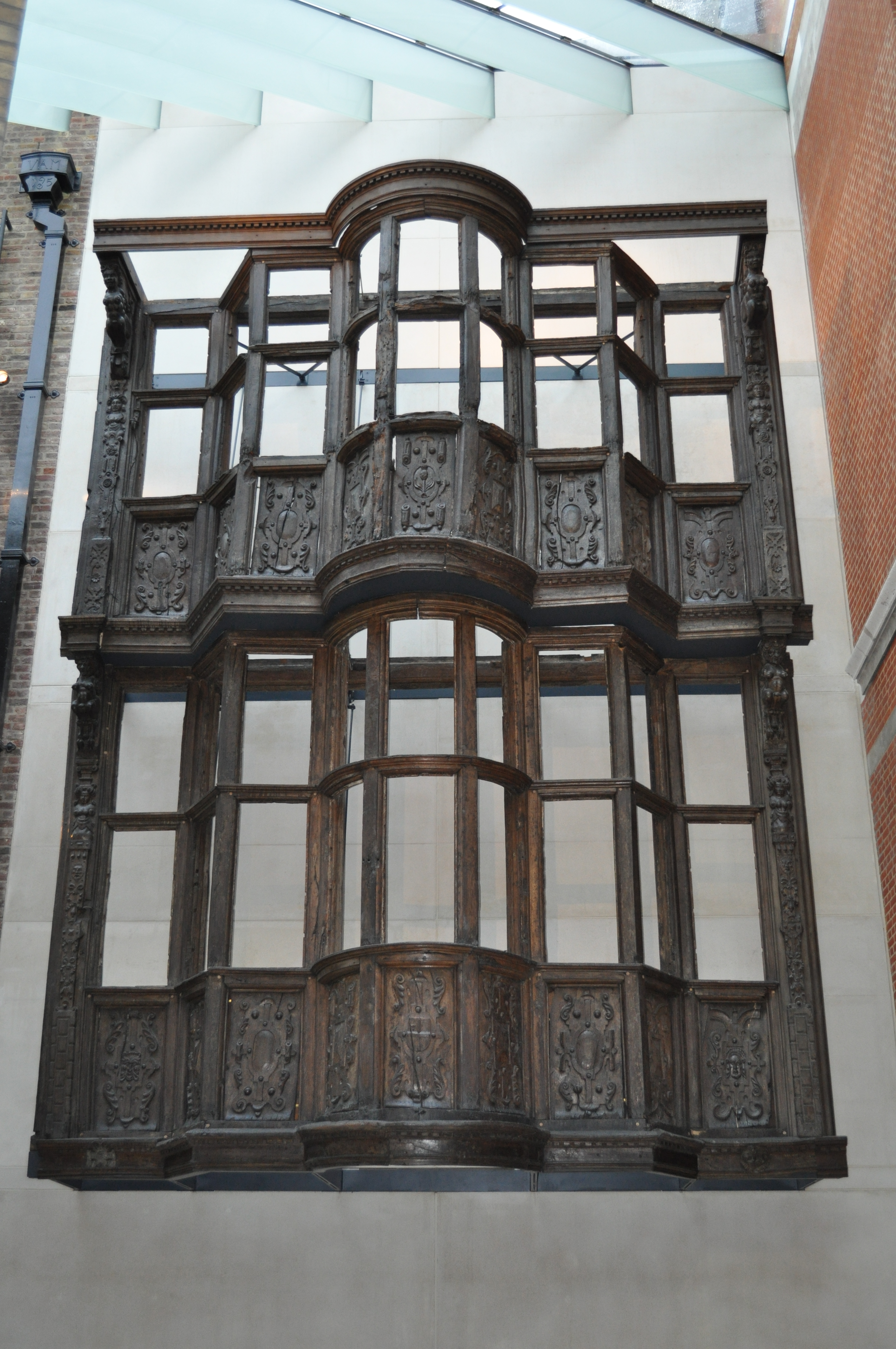
A jettied portion of the façade from a 16th century London house is preserved in the Daylit Gallery of the Victoria and Albert Museum (also note the "carell" windows).

Jettying (jetty, jutty, from Old French getee, jette) is a building technique used in medieval timber-frame buildings in which an upper floor juts out beyond the dimensions of the floor below. This has the advantage of increasing the available space in the building without obstructing the street. Jettied floors are also termed jetties. In the U.S., the most common surviving colonial version of this is the garrison house. Most jetties are external, but some early medieval houses were built with internal jetties.

== Structure ==
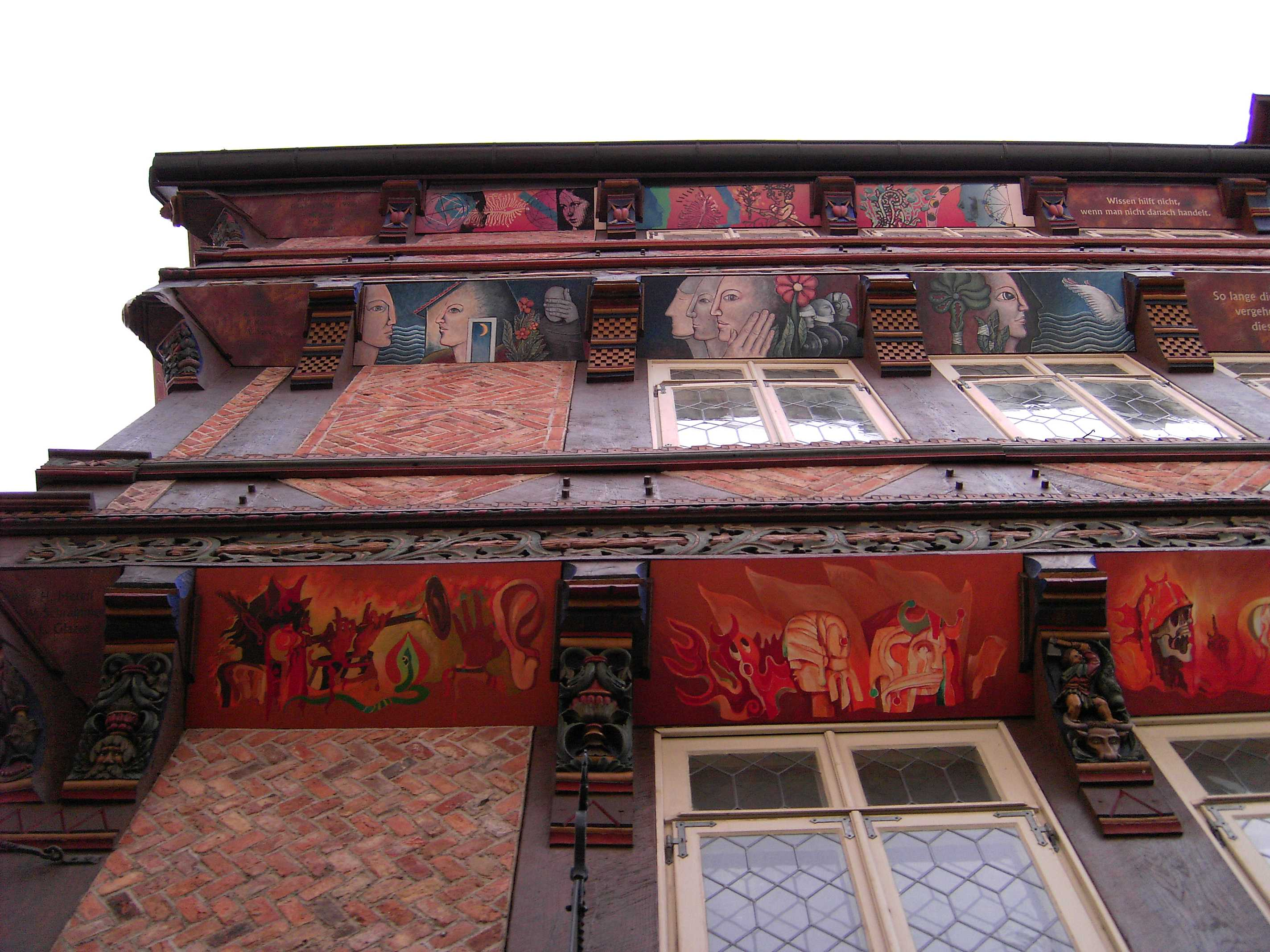
The under-side of jetties in Germany are sometimes decorated and called a windbrett (wind board). This is an example of a jetty supported on brackets.

A jetty is an upper floor that depends on a cantilever system in which a horizontal beam, the jetty bressummer, supports the wall above and projects forward beyond the floor below (a technique also called oversailing). The bressummer (or breastsummer) itself rests on the ends of a row of jetty beams or joists which are supported by jetty plates. Jetty joists in their turn were slotted sideways into the diagonal dragon beams at angle of 45° by means of mortise and tenon joints.

The overhanging corner posts are often reinforced by curved jetty brackets.

The origins of jettying are unclear but some reasons put forward for their purpose are:

- to gain space.
- the structural advantage of the jettied wall counteracting forces in the joists or tying a stone wall together
- to shelter the lower walls of the house from the weather.
- to simplify joinery.
- uses shorter timbers, a benefit due to timber shortages and difficult handling of long timbers especially in city streets.
- as a "symbol of wealth and status."

Jetties were popular in the 16th century but banned in Rouen in 1520 relating to air circulation and the plague, and London in 1667 relating to the great fire. They are considered a Gothic style.

Structurally, jetties are of several types:

- framed on multiple joists.
- framed on a few beams.
- framed on brackets added to the posts.
- hewn jetty also called a false jetty: Framed on projections of the posts rather than on cantilevered beams (or brackets).

=== Vertical elements ===
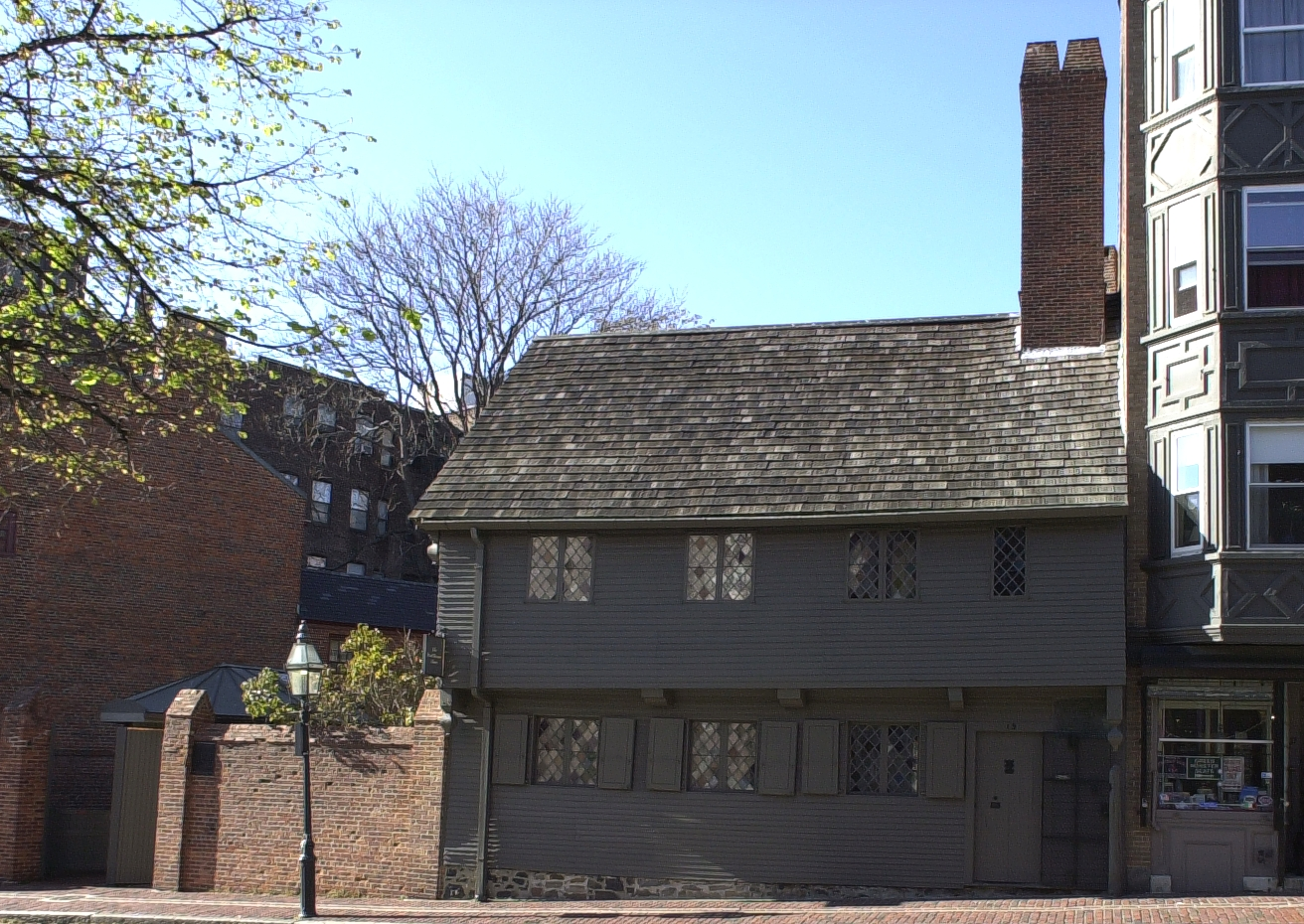
Paul Revere House Boston, Massachusetts, US, built 1680. This is framed on a few cantilevered beams.

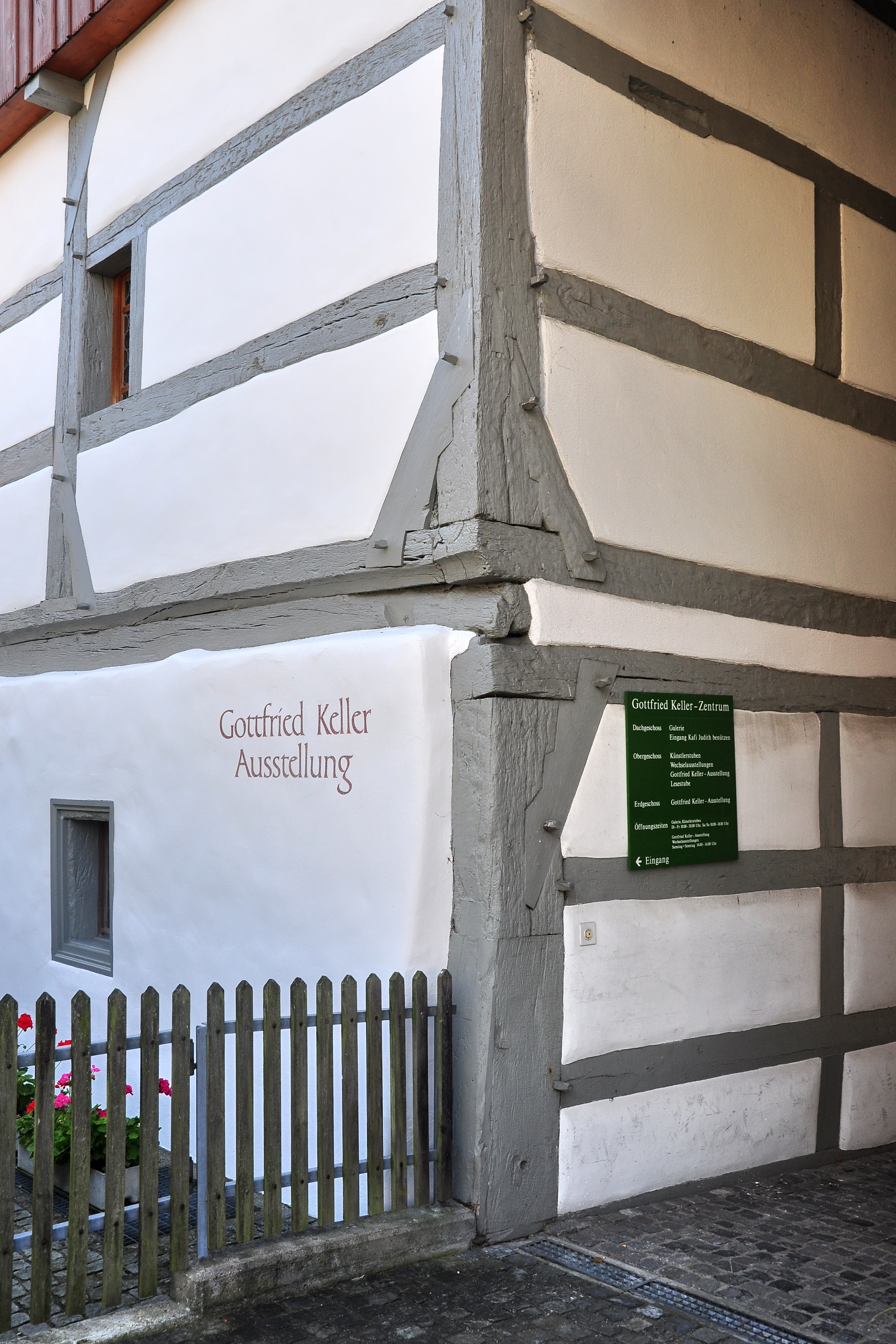
An example of a hewn jetty in Glattfelden, Switzerland

The vertical elements of jetties can be summarized as:

- the more massive corner posts of the timber frame that support the dragon beam from the floor below and are supported in their turn by the dragon beam for the extended floor above.
- the less substantial studs of the close studding along the walls above and below the jetty.

=== Horizontal elements ===
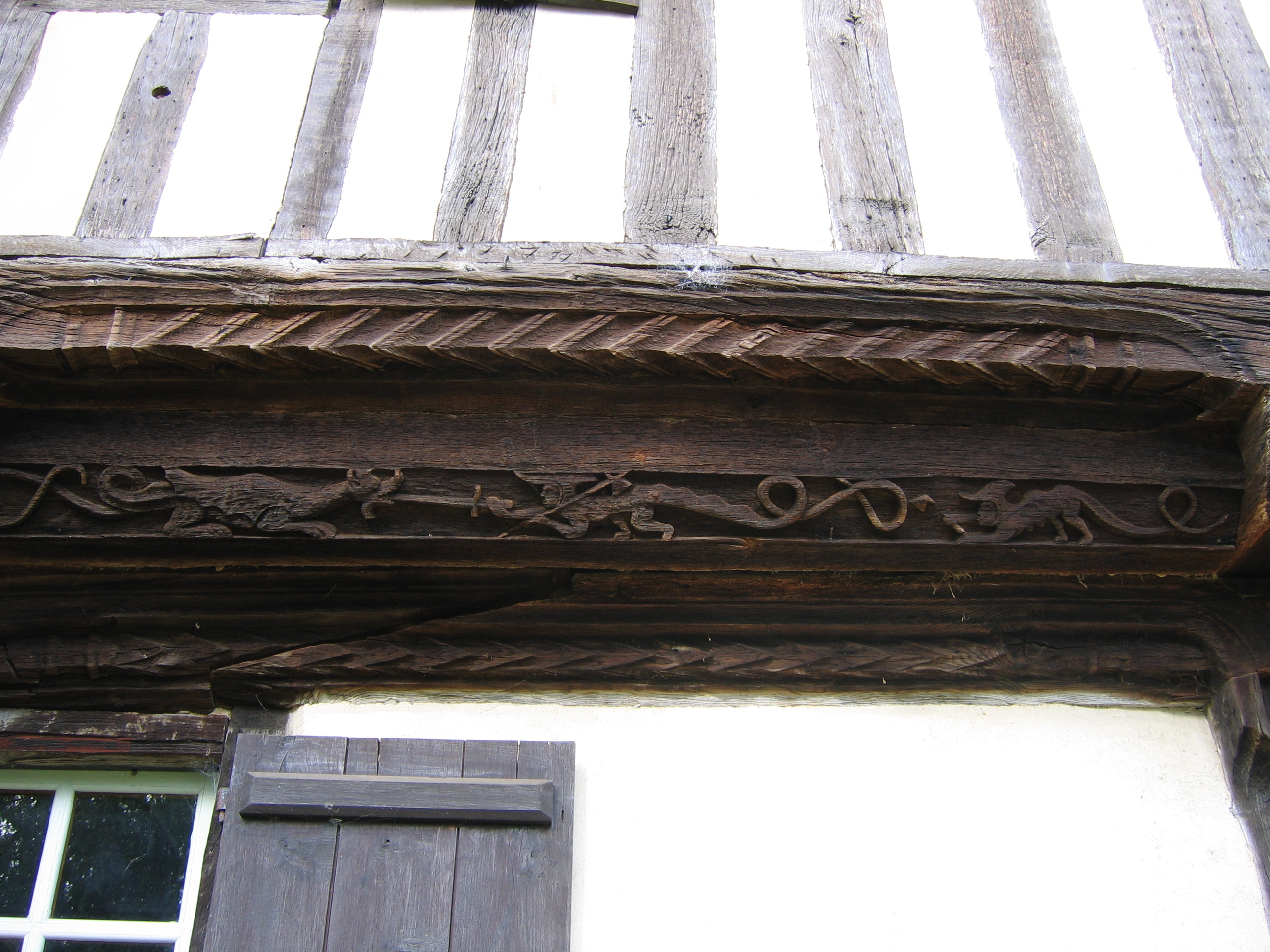
Jetties in French are called encorbellements and may be decoratively carved; Prieuré de Saint-Arnoult, France

The horizontal elements of jetties are:

- the jetty breastsummer (or bressummer), the sill on which the projecting wall above rests; the bressummer stretches across the whole width of the jetty wall
- the dragon-beam which runs diagonally from one corner to another, and supports the corner posts above and is supported in turn by the corner posts below
- the jetty beams or joists which conform to the greater dimensions of the floor above but rest at right angles on the jetty-plates that conform to the shorter dimensions of the floor below. The jetty beams are morticed at 45° into the sides of the dragon beams. They are the main constituents of the cantilever system and they determine how far the jetty projects
- the jetty-plates, designed to carry the jetty-beams or joints. The jetty-plate itself is supported by the corner posts of the recessed floor below.

== Cantilever ==
Jettying was used for timber-framed buildings, but was succeeded by cantilever which are used for the same reason as jettying, to maximise space in buildings. This is often utilised on buildings which are on a narrow plot and space is at a premium.

== Forebay ==
The Pennsylvania barn in the U.S. has a distinctive cantilever called a forebay, not a jetty.

== Mediterranean area ==
The traditional Turkish house is a half-timbered house with a cantilevered or supported overhang called a cumba.

In the North African Maghreb, houses in medieval city kasbahs often featured jetties. Contemporary examples still survive in the Casbah of Algiers.

The House of Opus Craticum, built before AD 79 in Roman Herculaneum, has a supported cantilever.

== See also ==
- Cantilever – modern buildings still use cantilevered floors, but the term jettying is rarely used. See for example 945 Madison Avenue in New York.
- Machicolation
- Overhang (architecture)
- Corbels, brackets that may be under a jetty
