= Opus emplectum =

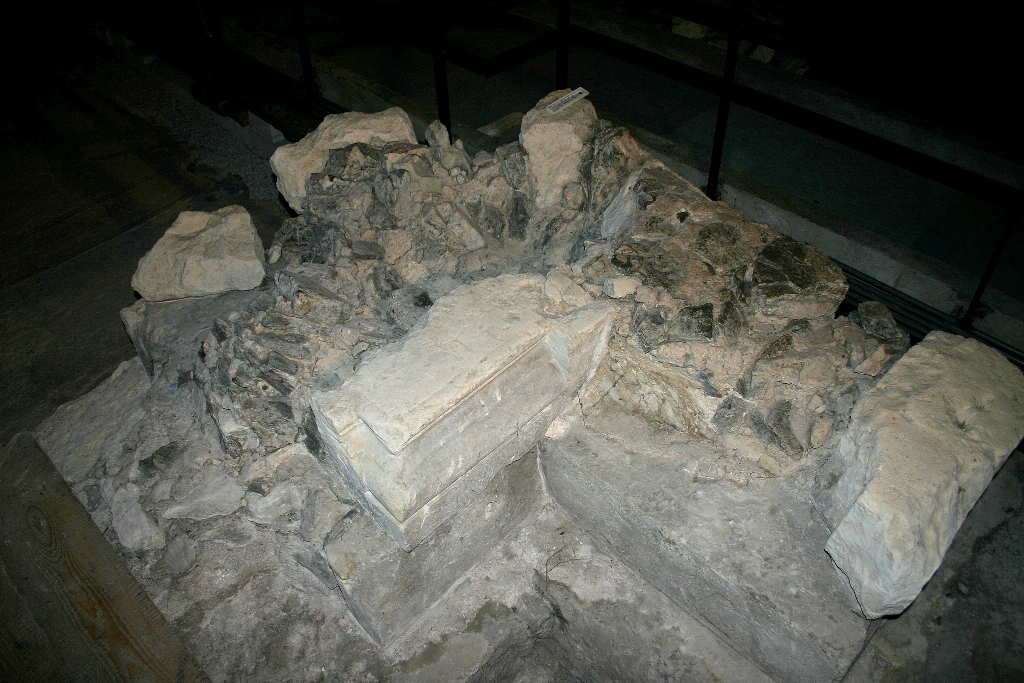
An example of opus emplectum at the second romanesque church in Wiślica - Regional Museum in Wiślica

Opus emplectum is an advanced Roman construction technique found in Roman and medieval architecture. Each side of a wall is constructed with finished stone blocks, leaving a substantial void between them. The void is filled with a mixture of rubble mixed with mortar.
