= Opus craticum =

Wall's technical construction from Roman Empire

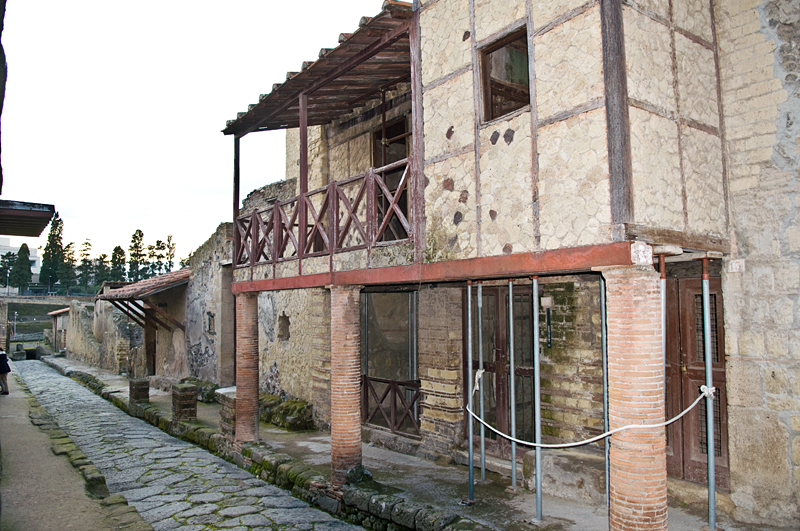
The House of Opus Craticum, Herculaneum, Italy

Opus craticum or craticii is an ancient Roman construction technique described by Vitruvius in his books De architectura as wattlework which is plastered over. It is often employed to construct partition walls and floors. Vitruvius disparaged this building technique as a grave fire risk, likely to have cracked plaster, and not durable. Surviving examples were found in the archaeological excavations at Pompeii and more so at Herculaneum, buried by the eruption of Mount Vesuvius in 79 AD and excavated beginning in 1929.

Scholarly confusion exists since the term opus craticium is also used for the Roman building technique very similar, but not identified as being directly related to half-timbering, a timber framework with the wall infill of stones in mortar called opus incertum. An example of this technique is the House of Opus Craticum in Herculaneum. This building, which was constructed some time in the first century or earlier, was reconstructed at Herculaneum's Insula III, nos. 13, 14, and 15.

The opus craticum was not a Roman invention as variations of the technique is also found elsewhere in ancient Mediterranean. Before the Romans, the Minoans, Etruscans, and Greeks are known to have used similar building techniques. At least since the 13th century, this type of construction, common in Europe, was called half-timbered in English, Fachwerk (framework) in German, entramado de madera in Spanish, and colombage in French.
