= Roman masonry =

Building techniques in Ancient Rome

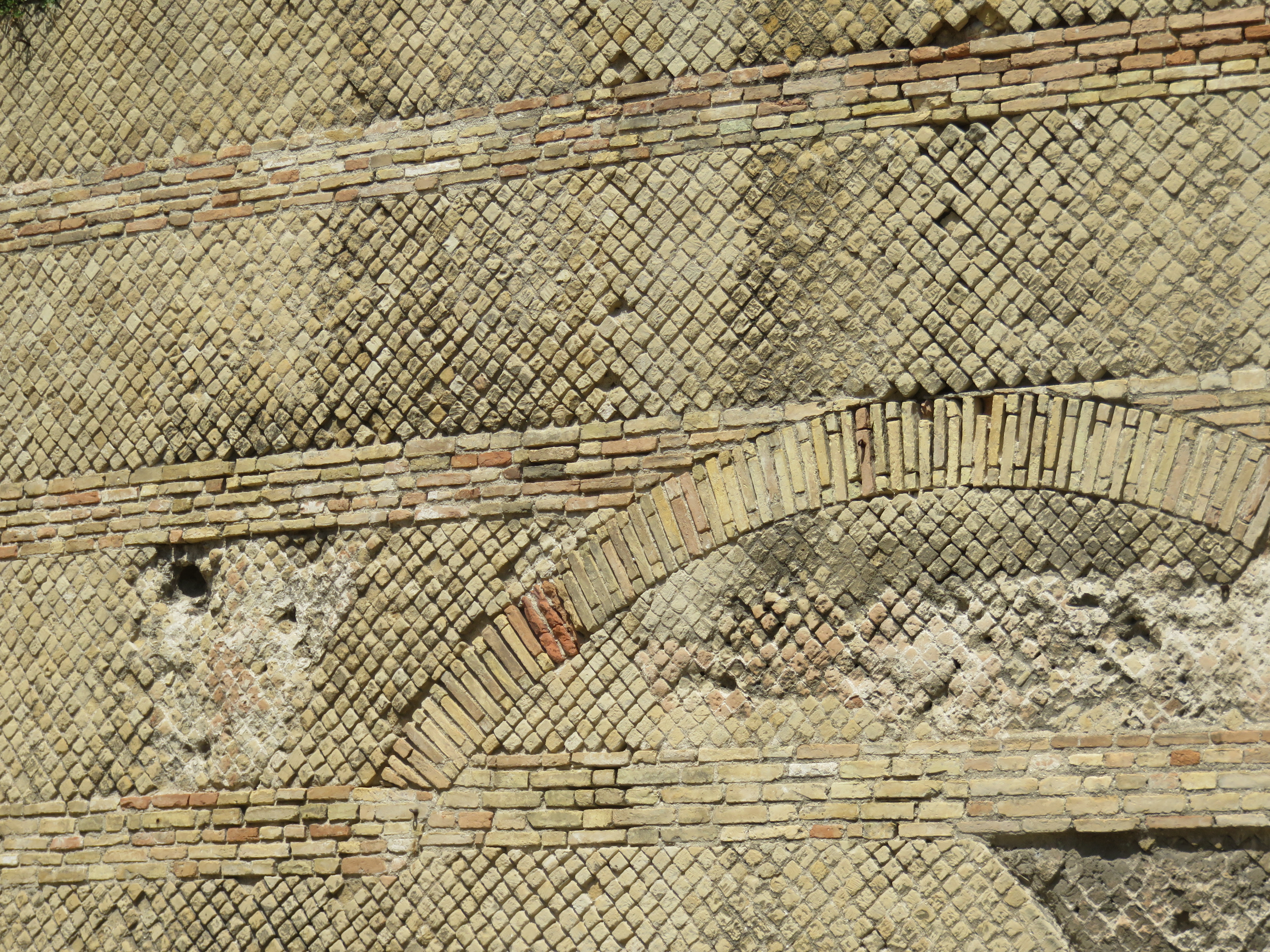
Roman masonry on the amphitheatre of Ancona, Italy

Roman masonry, sometimes also called Roman stonework, describes the different building techniques made out of bricks and stones in Ancient Rome.

== Typology ==
The Latin word opus translates into “work” and in the more narrow sense to the meaning of masonry, construction technique, or construction material.

=== Masonry ===
Example	Name	Description
	Opus africanum	A form of ashlar masonry, characterized by pillars of vertical blocks of stone alternating with horizontal blocks, filled in with smaller blocks in between
	Opus caementicium (Roman concrete)	Concrete-like material for cast or shell walls
	Opus emplectum	Double-walled masonry with outer and inner stone layers and cast core
	Opus incertum / opus antiquum	Cast masonry with irregular and randomly placed uncut stones
	Opus isodomum	Perfectly cut, completely regular squared ashlar blocks of equal height, and sometimes same length.
	Opus latericium / opus testaceum	Cast masonry core with a brick facing
	Opus listatum / opus vittatum	Combination masonry with alternating brick and narrow stone layers; brick tie connects layers.
	Opus mixtum / opus compositum / opus vagecum	Mixed masonry combining brick layers with other techniques (incertum, reticulatum, vittatum)
	Opus quadratum	Masonry of regular, rectangular stone blocks
	Opus reticulatum	Cast masonry with net-like pattern of Tuff stones set at 45°, “diamond-shaped”
	Opus siliceum	Polygonal masonry consisting of stones that have five or more face angles, in contrast to ashlar blocks which have four rectangular ones.
	Opus spicatum	Masonry in herringbone or spike pattern

=== Other styles and traditions ===
Example	Name	Description
	Opus albarium / opus tectorium	Originally plaster for tempera painting, later used for general white stucco work
	Opus craticum (or craticii)	Plastered over timber framed wattlework
	Opus figlinum	Pavement formed out of squares of brick or terracotta, set flat and on edge alternately
	Opus sectile	Materials were cut and inlaid into walls and floors to create motifs or pattern
	Opus signinum	Waterproof screed
	Opus tessellatum	Technique for Greek and Roman mosaic, made from tesserae (bigger tesserae than opus vermiculatum)
	Opus vermiculatum	Use of tiny tesserae to emphasise outlines, sometimes in opus tessellatum

== See also ==
- Roman architectural revolution
- Ancient Roman architecture
- Byzantine architecture
- Ancient Greek architecture
