= Opus albarium =

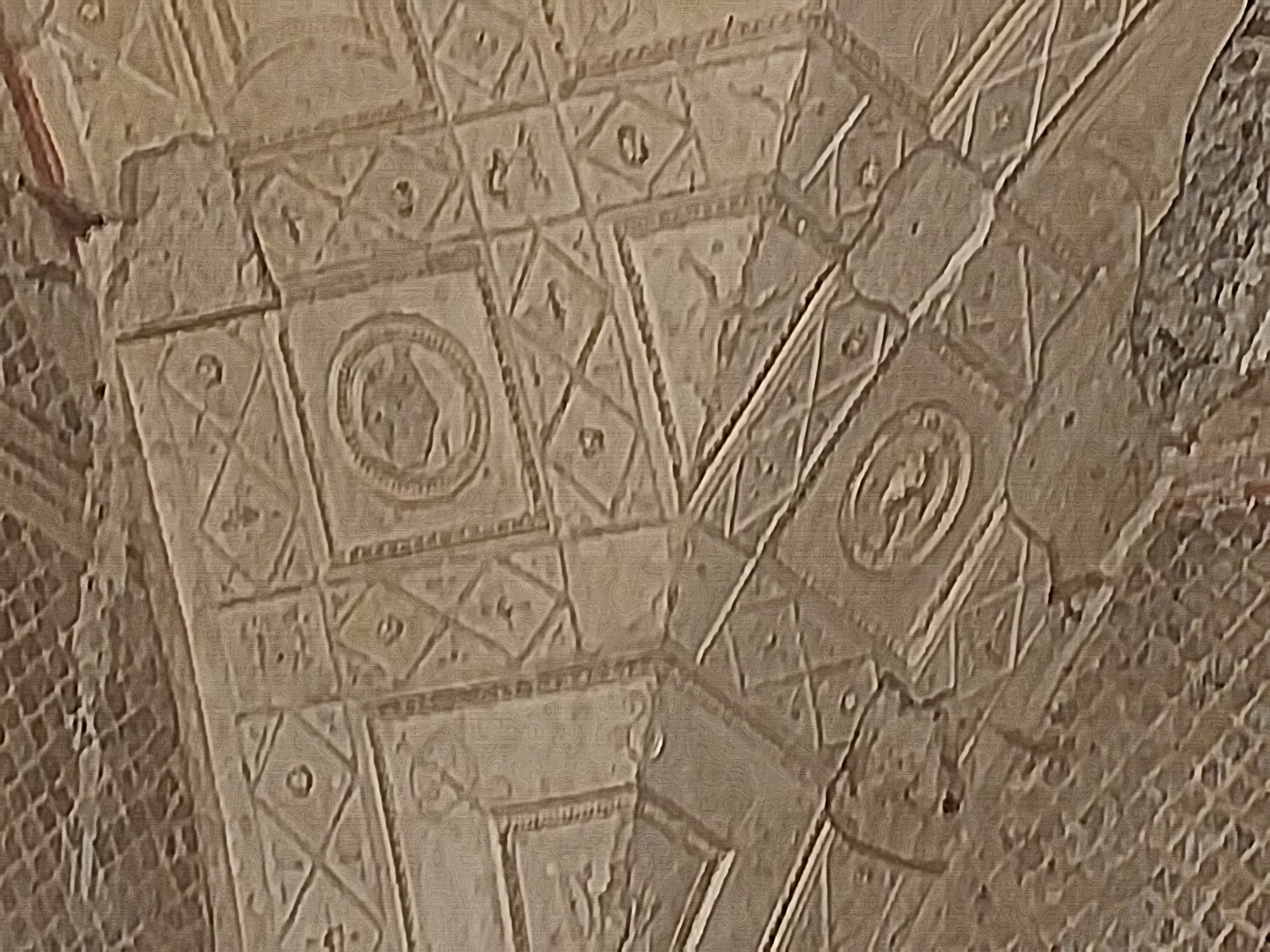
Opus albarium on a vault in Hadrian's Villa

Opus albarium or opus tectorium, literally "plasterwork", is a type of masonry construction used in Roman times. It is used in the interiors of houses, consisting of a special stucco incorporating marble dust, then beaten compact with rammers to finish the interior walls and ceilings of houses.

== Description ==
Opus albarium is similar to modern stucco. It consists of pure lime, polished to get it as white as possible. It was often a final layer, with no intention of painting the wall afterwards. The Romans burned shells in lime kilns to obtain lime. The slaked lime was soaked in water, then struck through with a tiller. If the lime stuck to the iron, it was well prepared.

The technique is described by Vitruvius. Varro states that such wall coatings make buildings cooler.
