= Opus figlinum =

Form of Ancient Roman masonry

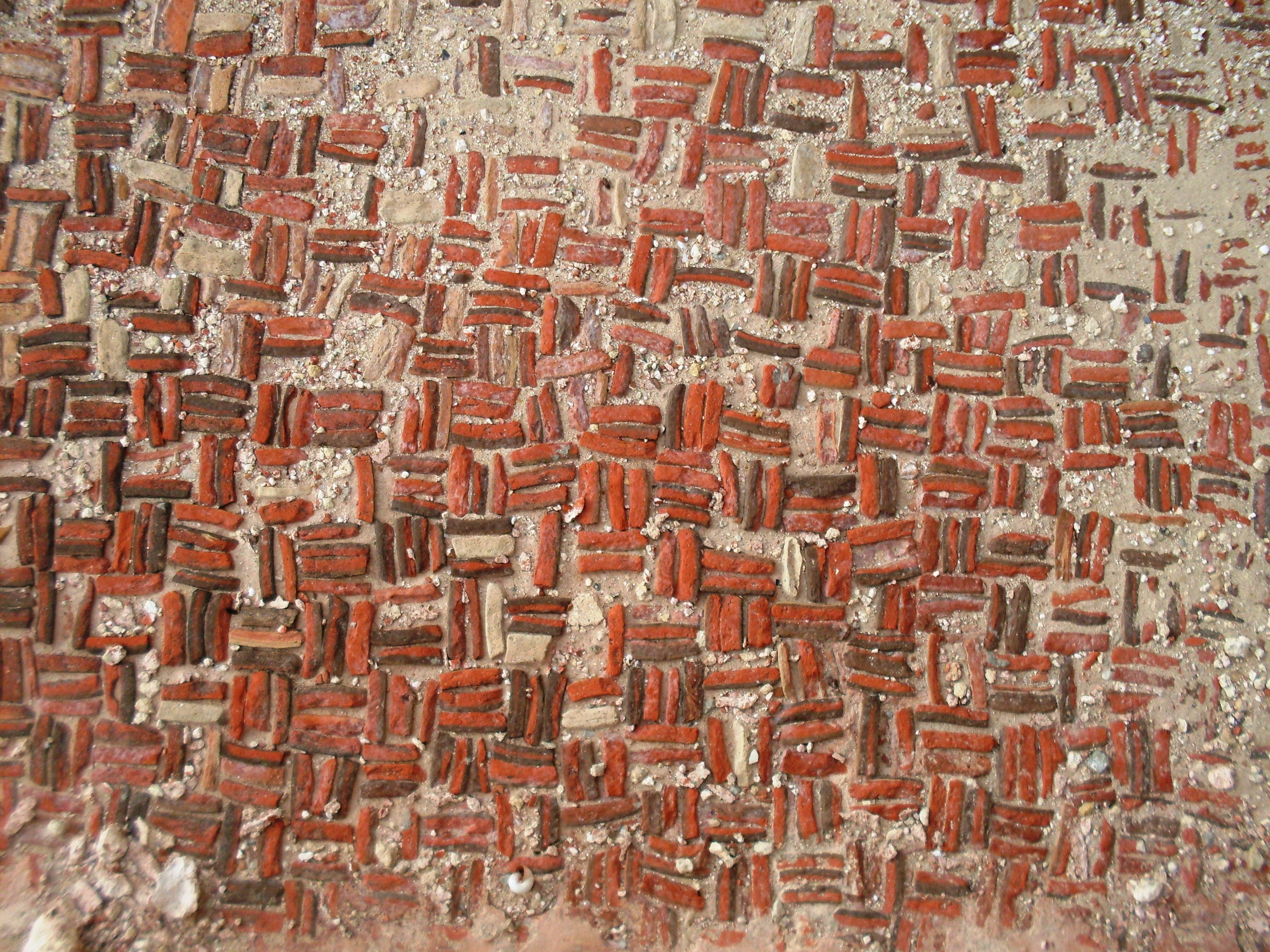
Pavement of the salting pans in Neapolis (Tunisia)

Opus figlinum or opus figulinum, literally "pottery", is a type of masonry construction used in Roman architecture. It is a pavement formed of squares of pottery or terracotta, set flat and on edge alternately.

== Description ==
Pavements in opus figlinum are usually made up of rectangular ceramic pottery or brick fragments of the same size, placed in groups of three. The orientation of adjacent groups is alternately vertical and horizontal; thus, the juxtaposition creates the visual impression of a braid pattern. The fragments are fixed to the subfloor with mortar. The stone fragments used are very small: about 2.5 × 2.5 × 2 cm.
