= Opus africanum =

Form of ashlar masonry used in Carthaginian and ancient Roman architecture

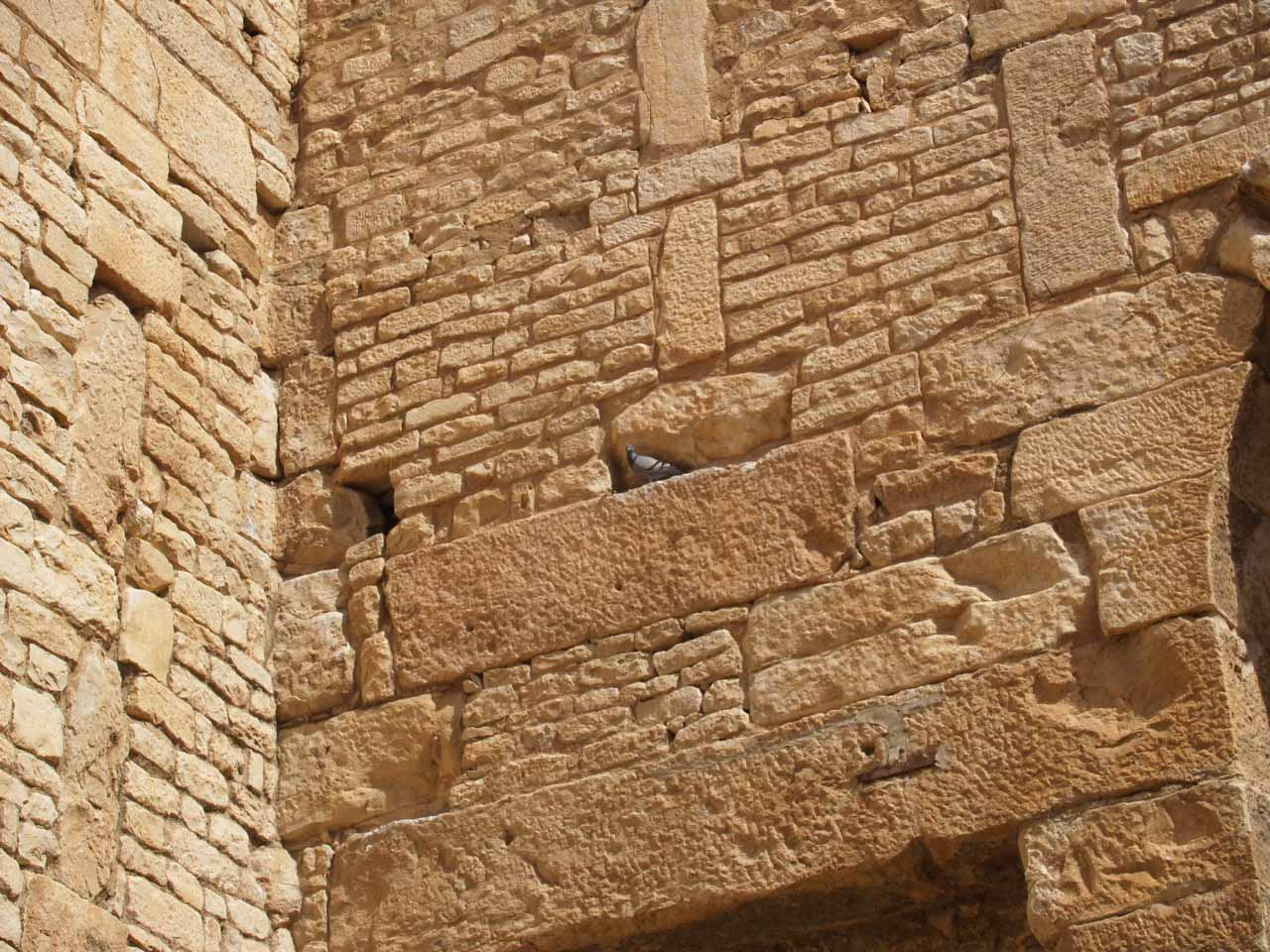
Opus africanum used in Dougga's Capitol.

Opus Africanum or Carthaginian Craft is a form of ashlar masonry developed by Phoenicians in the Levant and later spread by Carthaginians across the Mediterranean region. It is characterized by pillars of vertical blocks of stone alternating with horizontal blocks, filled in with smaller blocks in between.

Its name derives from the Roman province of Africa, and is common in North Africa, but also found in Sicily and Southern Italy.

== Types ==
=== Irregular vertical blocks ===
This form is used mainly to reinforce the lower sections, or socles, of walls. It is documented in Punic contexts in Tunisia, Sicily, southern Spain, and Sardinia from the 7th to 4th centuries BC. It is also found in Etruscan contexts from the 6th century BC and at the Celtic oppidum of Ensérune in southern France, where it is interpreted as a Roman import.

=== Piers of superimposed blocks ===
Where all the blocks are vertical and carefully squared due to the piers being structurally independent of the infill between them. This form appears in Punic contexts from the mid-2nd century BC in Tunisia and the 1st century BC in Spain. During the Roman period, it remained common in the Maghreb and also occurred in parts of Spain outside areas of earlier Punic influence.

=== Alternating vertical and horizontal blocks ===
In this form, the piers are tied to the infill rather than structurally independent from it. The blocks therefore require less precise shaping. The earliest examples discussed in the report are from Punic western Sicily and Italy in the 4th and 3rd centuries BC. Notable exemple include, Punic houses at Bulla Regia in North Africa, and the houses of the Samnite aristocracy at Pompeii, where the technique was used in side and internal walls, while ashlar masonry was preferred for façades.

== See also ==
- Roman masonry – building techniques in Ancient Rome
- Roman concrete (opus caementicium) – building material used in construction during the late Roman Republic and the Roman Empire
- Dougga in Tunisia contains many examples of opus africanum

== Reference ==
- Adam, Jean-Pierre (1999). Roman Building. Routledge. Pages 120–121.
