= Opus latericium =

Ancient Roman brickwork construction

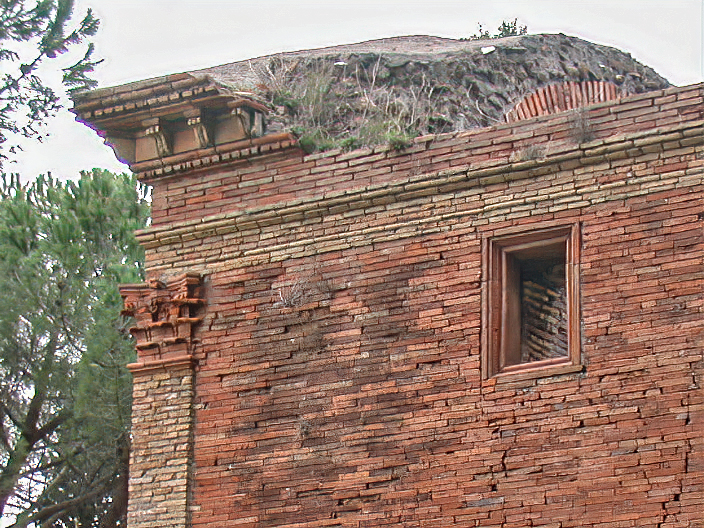
Example of opus latericium on a tomb of the ancient Appian Way in Rome.

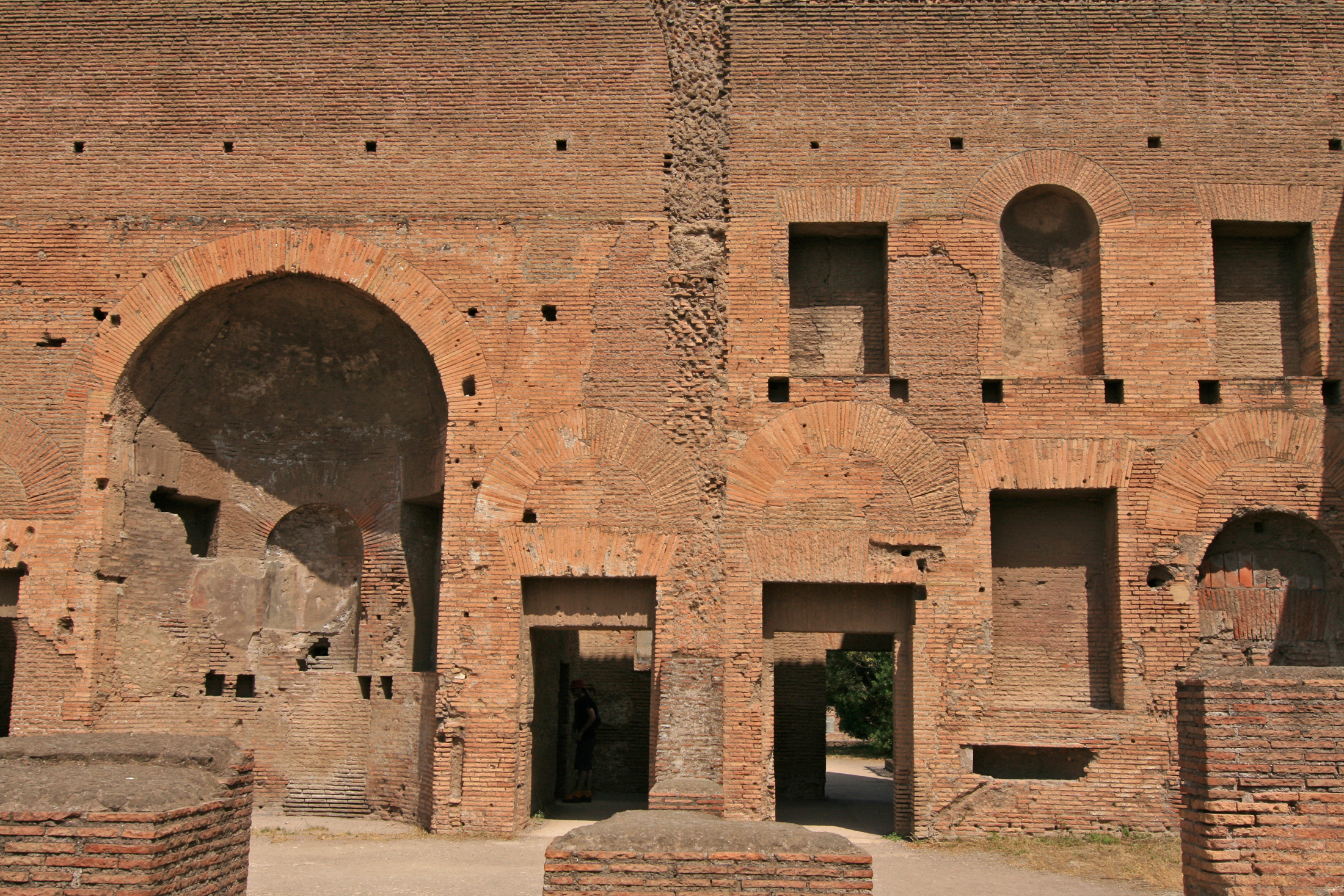
A wall of the Domus Augustana in Rome

Opus latericium (Latin for "brick work") is an ancient Roman construction technique in which course-laid brickwork is used to face a core of opus caementicium.

Opus reticulatum was the dominant form of wall construction in the Imperial era. In the time of the architectural writer Vitruvius, opus latericium seems to have designated structures built using unfired mud bricks.

== See also ==
- Ancient Roman architecture
- Roman masonry – building techniques in Ancient Rome
- Roman concrete – Building material used in ancient Rome
