= Opus incertum =

Ancient Roman masonry using irregular stones in a core of concrete

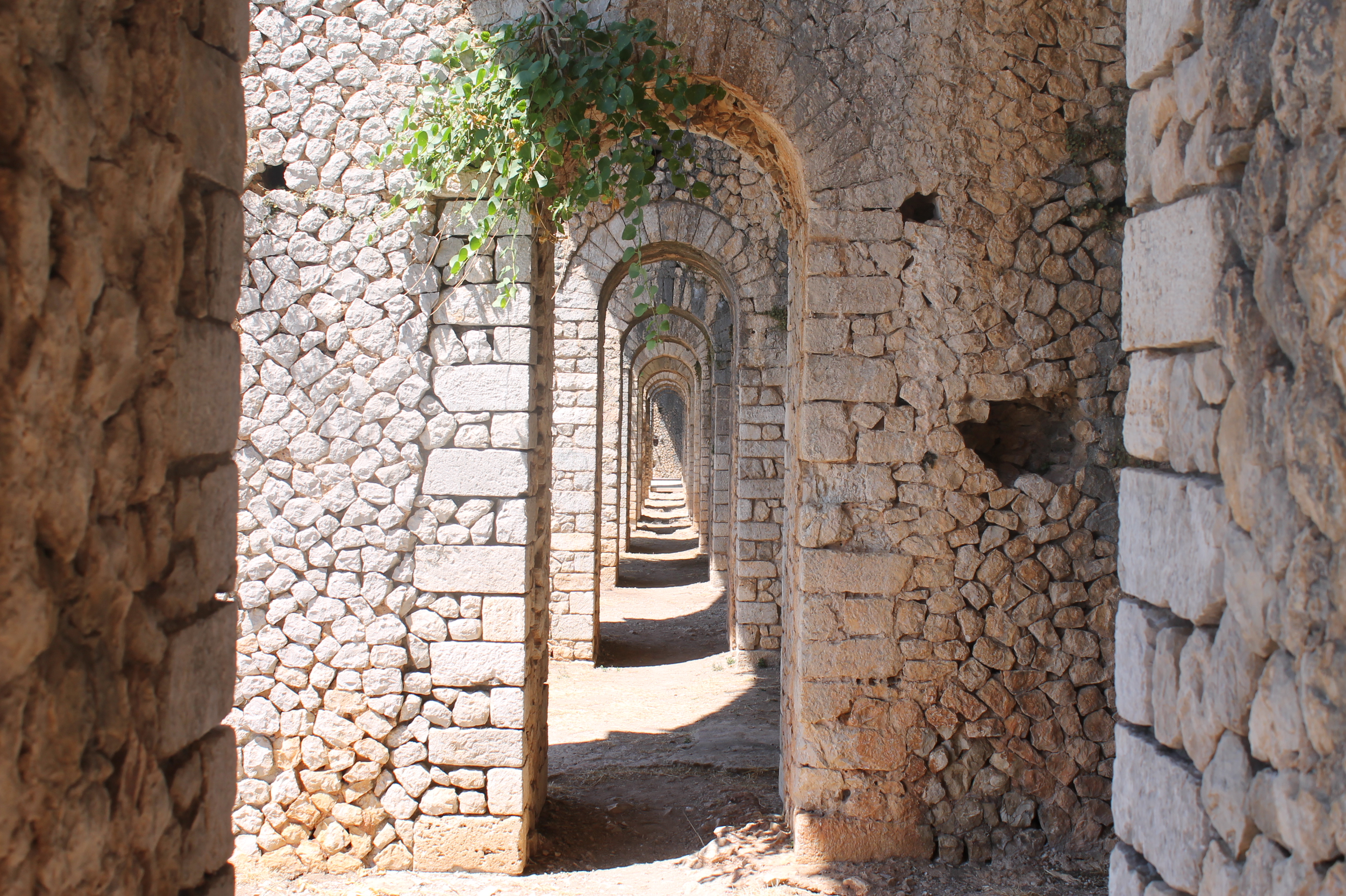
Opus incertum on the Temple of Jupiter Anxur in Terracina, Italy

Opus incertum ("irregular work") was an ancient Roman construction technique, using irregularly shaped and randomly placed uncut stones or fist-sized tuff blocks inserted in a core of opus caementicium.

Initially it consisted of more careful placement of the caementa (rock fragments and small stones mixed with concrete), making the external surface as plain as possible. Later the external surface became plainer still by reducing the amount of concrete and choosing more regular small stones. When the amount of concrete between stones is particularly reduced, it is defined as opus quasi reticulatum. Used from the beginning of the 2nd century BC until the mid-1st century BC, it was later largely superseded by opus reticulatum.

Vitruvius, in De architectura (Ten Books on Architecture), favours opus incertum, deriding opus reticulatum as more expensive and structurally inferior, since cracks propagate more easily.

== See also ==
- Roman masonry – building techniques in Ancient Rome
- Roman concrete, also known as Opus caementicium – Building material used in ancient Rome
