= Opus vittatum =

Ancient Roman construction technique

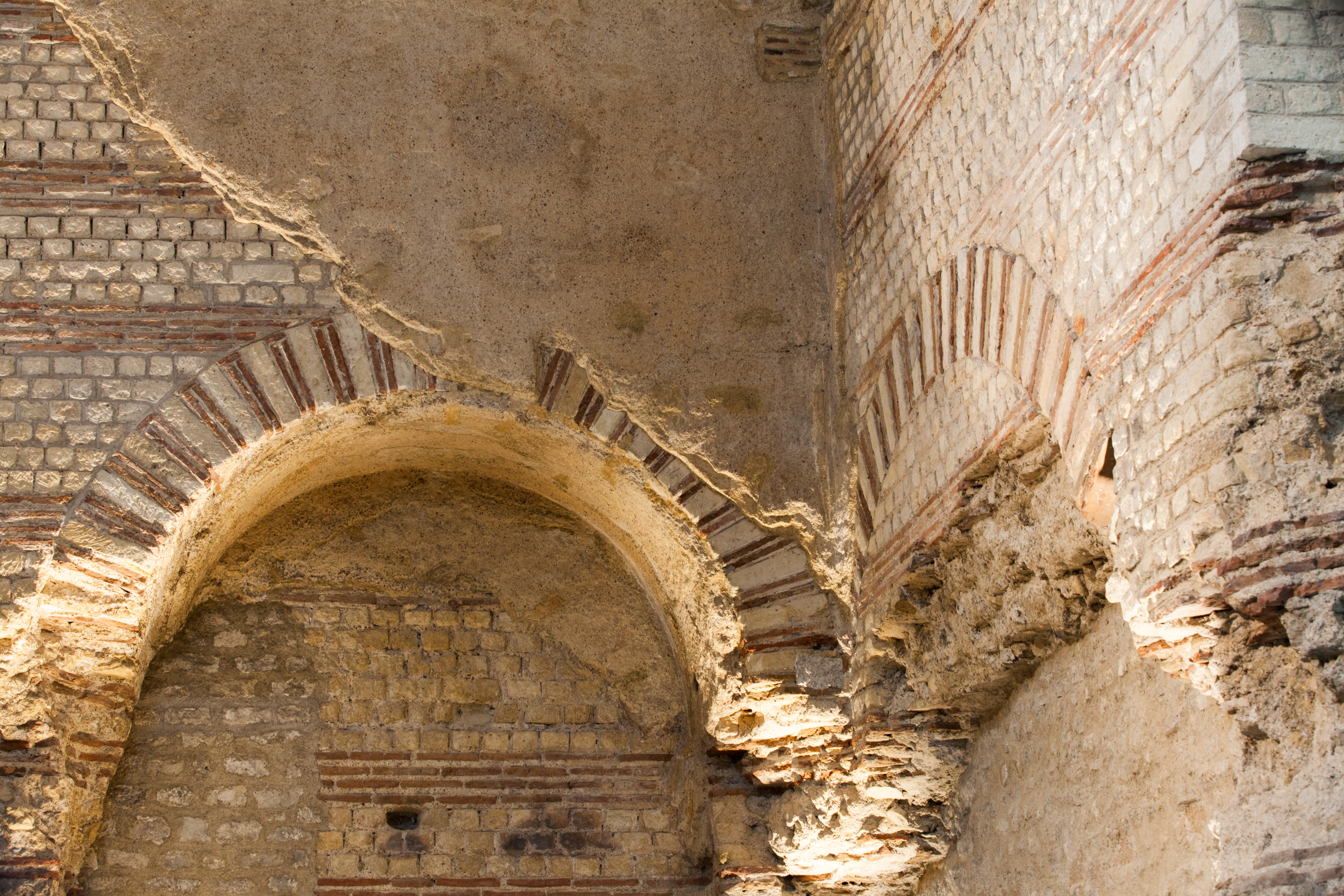
Opus vittatum at the Thermes de Cluny, (frigidarium)

Opus vittatum ("banded work"), also called opus listatum, was an ancient Roman construction technique introduced at the beginning of the fourth century, made by parallel horizontal courses of tuff blocks alternated with bricks.

This technique was adopted during the whole 4th century, and is typical of the works of Maxentius and Constantine.

== See also ==
- Ancient Roman architecture
- Roman masonry – building techniques in ancient Rome
- Roman concrete – Building material used in ancient Rome

== Sources ==
- Coarelli, Filippo (1974). Guida archeologica di Roma (in Italian). Milano: Arnoldo Mondadori Editore.
