= Love hotel =

Sex hotels; often associated with those in Japan

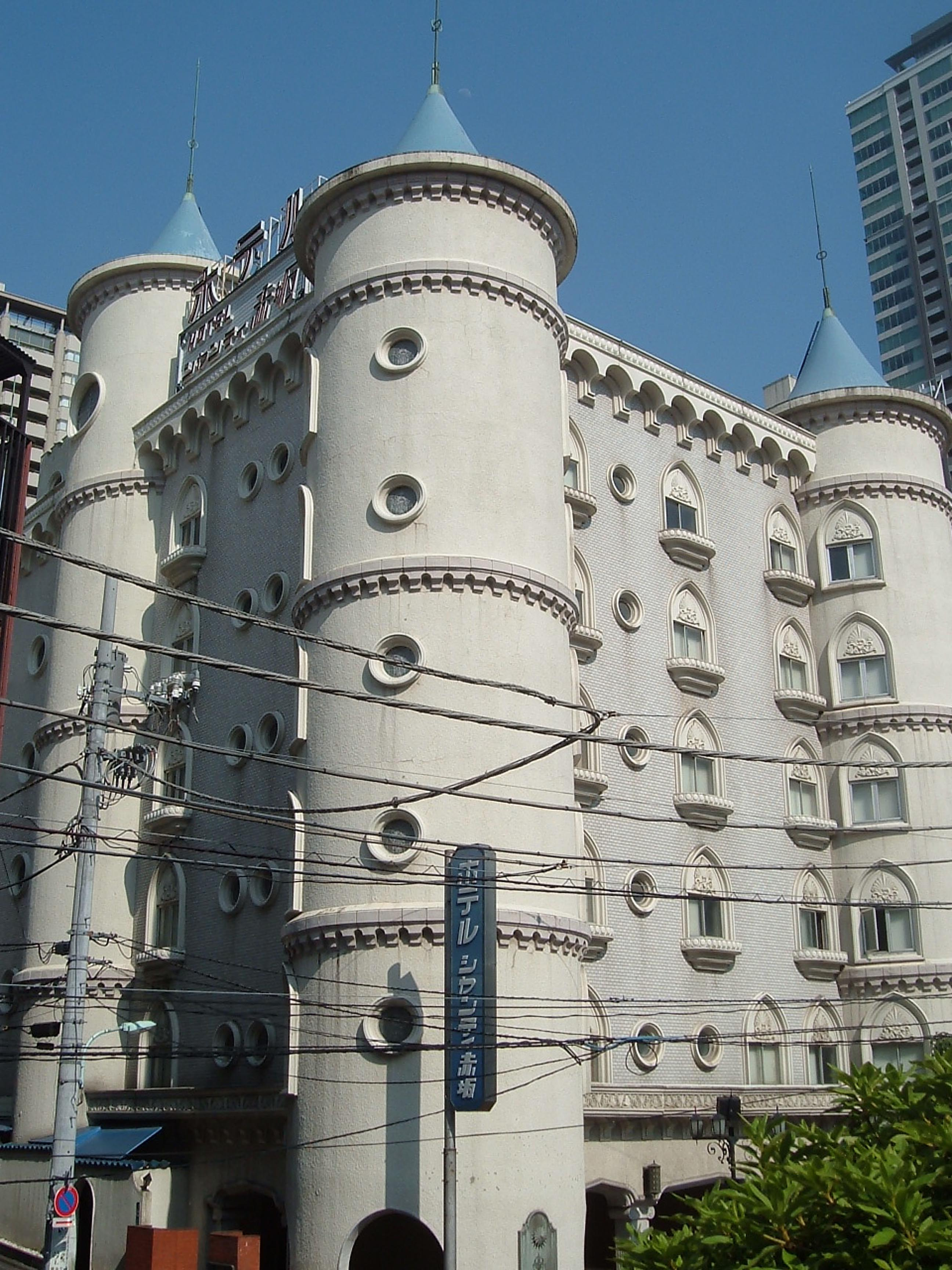
Love hotel in Tokyo, European castle motif

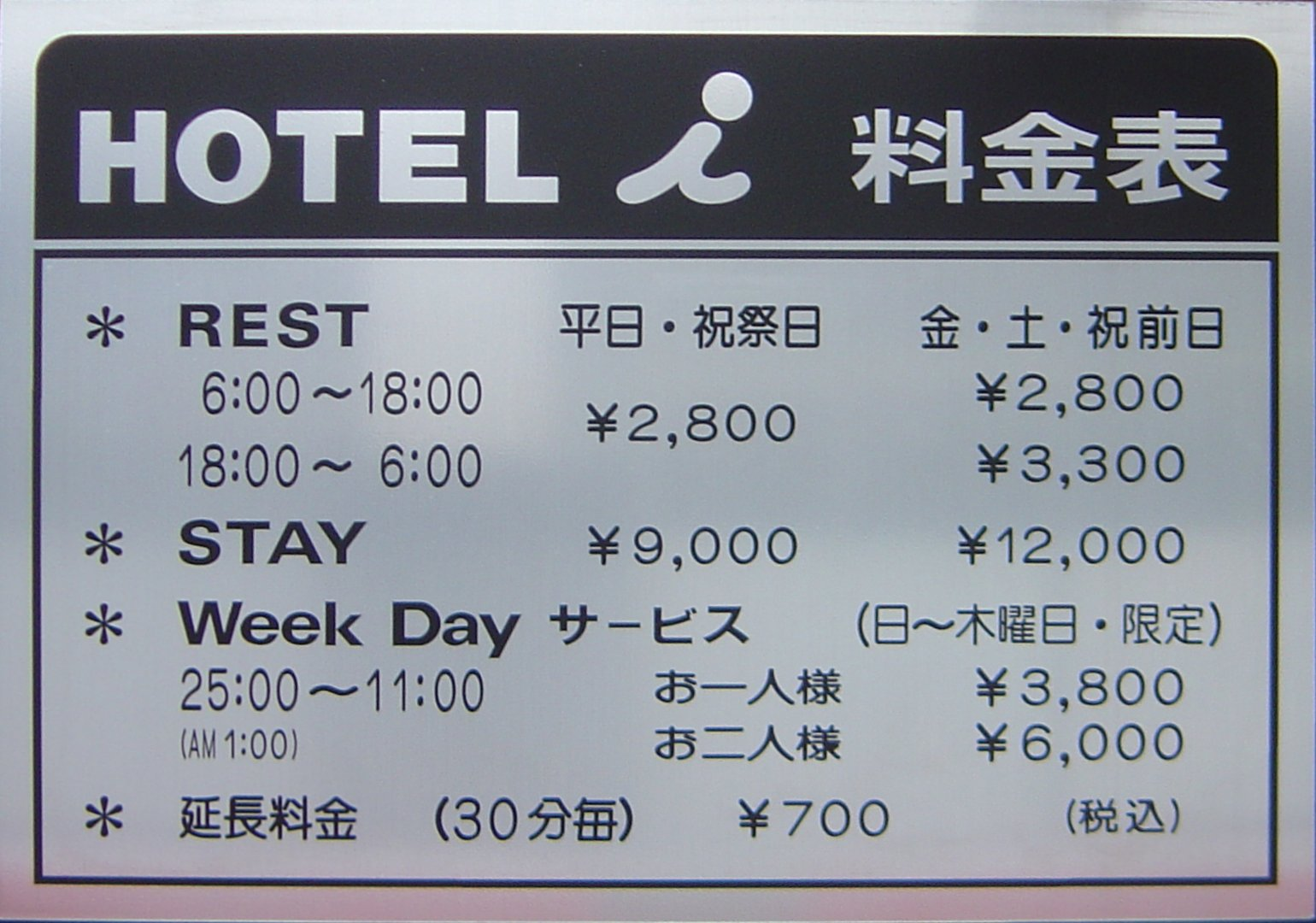
Price list at a love hotel in Shinjuku, Tokyo

A love hotel is a type of short-stay hotel found around the world operated primarily for the purpose of allowing guests privacy for sex. Unlike typical hotels, where overnight stays are required, at love hotels, short visits are allowed. The name originates from "Hotel Love" in Osaka, Japan. Although love hotels exist all over the world, the term "love hotel" is often used to refer specifically to those located within Japan.

Love hotels can usually be identified using symbols such as hearts and the offer of a room rate for a "rest" (休憩, kyūkei) as well as for an overnight stay. The period of a "rest" varies, typically ranging from one to three hours. Cheaper daytime off-peak rates are common. In general, reservations are not possible, and leaving the hotel will forfeit access to the room; overnight-stay rates become available only after 22:00. These hotels may be used for prostitution, although they are sometimes used by budget-travelers sharing accommodation.

Entrances are discreet, and interaction with staff is minimized. Rooms are often selected from a panel of buttons, and the bill may be settled by pneumatic tube, vending machine, or paying an unseen staff member behind a pane of frosted glass. Parking lots will often be concealed and windows will be few, so as to maximize privacy.To increase privacy for hotel patrons, love hotels may have a range of entrances and exits.

Although cheaper hotels are often simply furnished, higher-end hotels may feature fanciful rooms decorated with anime characters, be equipped with rotating beds, ceiling mirrors, karaoke machines, and unusual lighting. They may be styled similarly to dungeons or other fantasy scenes, sometimes including S&M gear.

These hotels are typically either concentrated in city districts close to stations, near highways on the city outskirts or in industrial districts. Love hotel architecture is sometimes garish, with buildings shaped like castles, boats or UFOs and lit with neon lighting. Some more recent love hotels are ordinary looking buildings, distinguished mainly by having small, covered or no windows.

== Around the world ==
=== Canada ===
Motel Rideau in Brossard, Quebec, offers lower "siesta" rates for short visits.

A Japanese-influenced love hotel project in Canada opened its doors in Toronto in early 2019, which was the first and only love hotel in the country to offer an authentic Japanese experience. Due to the love hotel only being a temporary project, it has been closed down since late 2019.

=== Hong Kong ===
There are three predominant chained hourly hotel groups (Victoria, Park Excellent, and Kowloon Tong) in Hong Kong since the 1990s, as the economy was booming. There were hundreds of nightclubs opening, and many of those girls offer prostitution service (both hourly, overnight), where people usually opted for the cheaper option (hourly) and that play a big role in the growing trend of hourly hotels. In the 2010s onward, hourly hotels are mainly frequented by young couples, who would not otherwise have access to a private space for intimate activities.

=== Japan ===
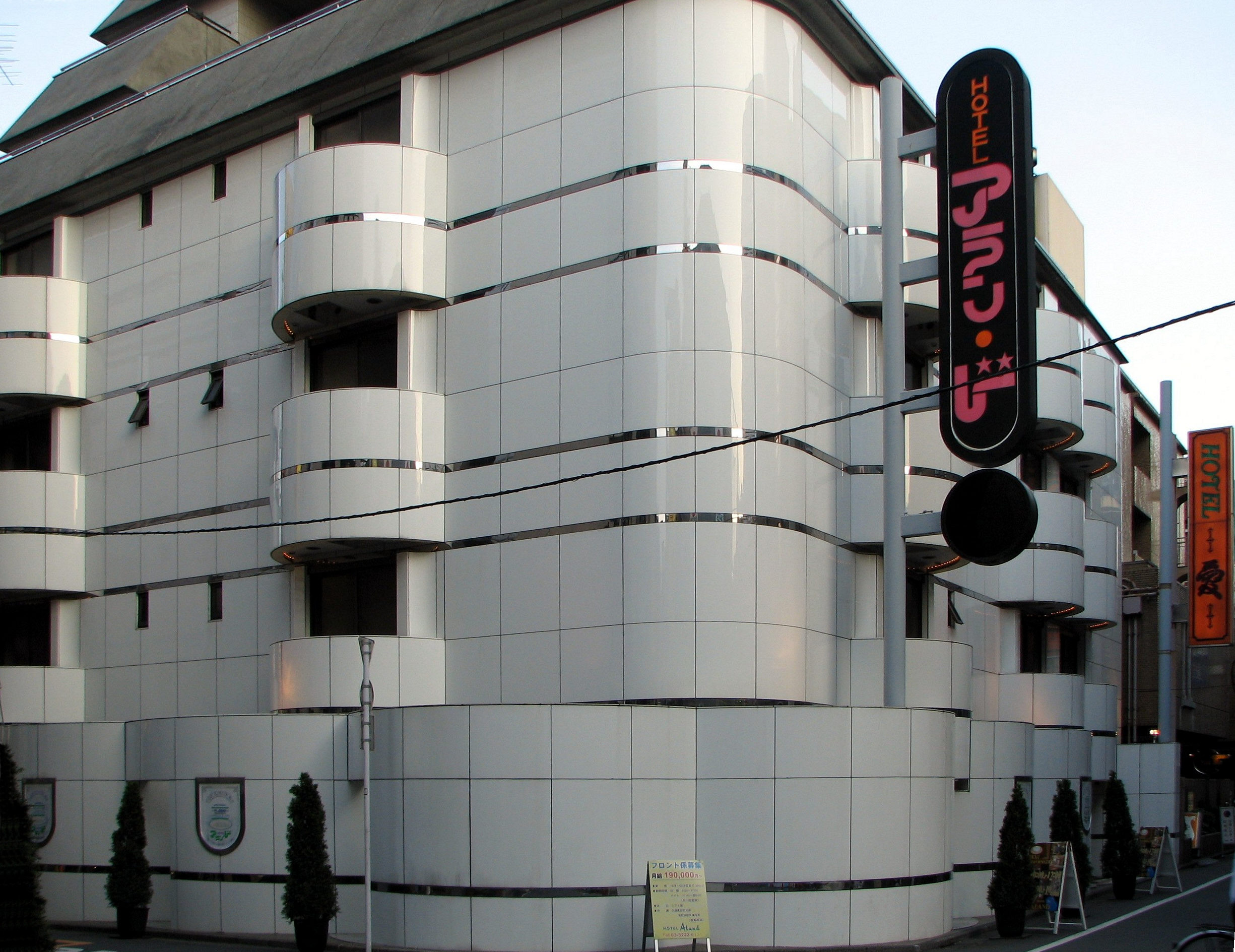
Love hotel with no windows

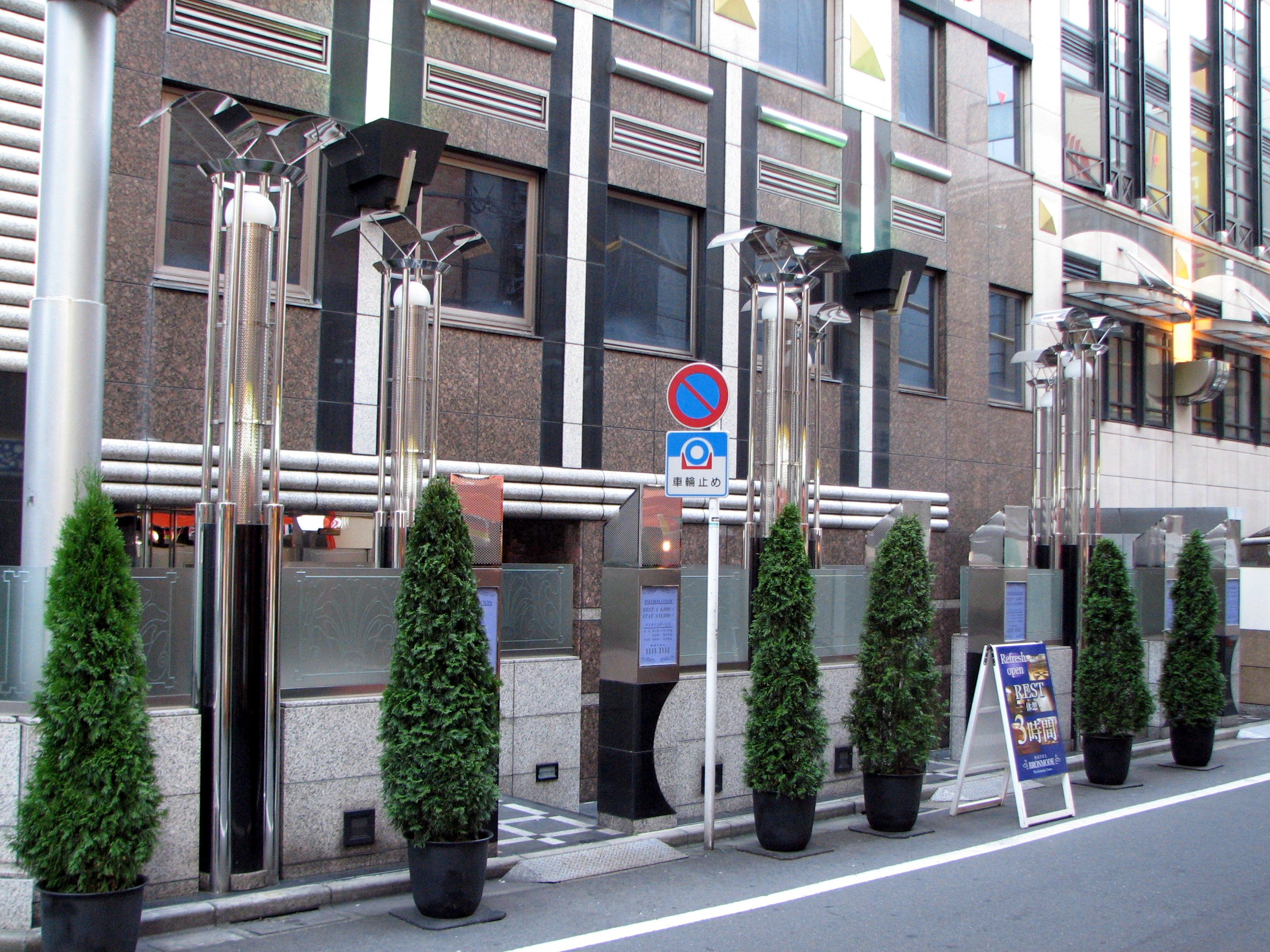
Some love hotels have multiple complex entrances designed for the discretion of customers.

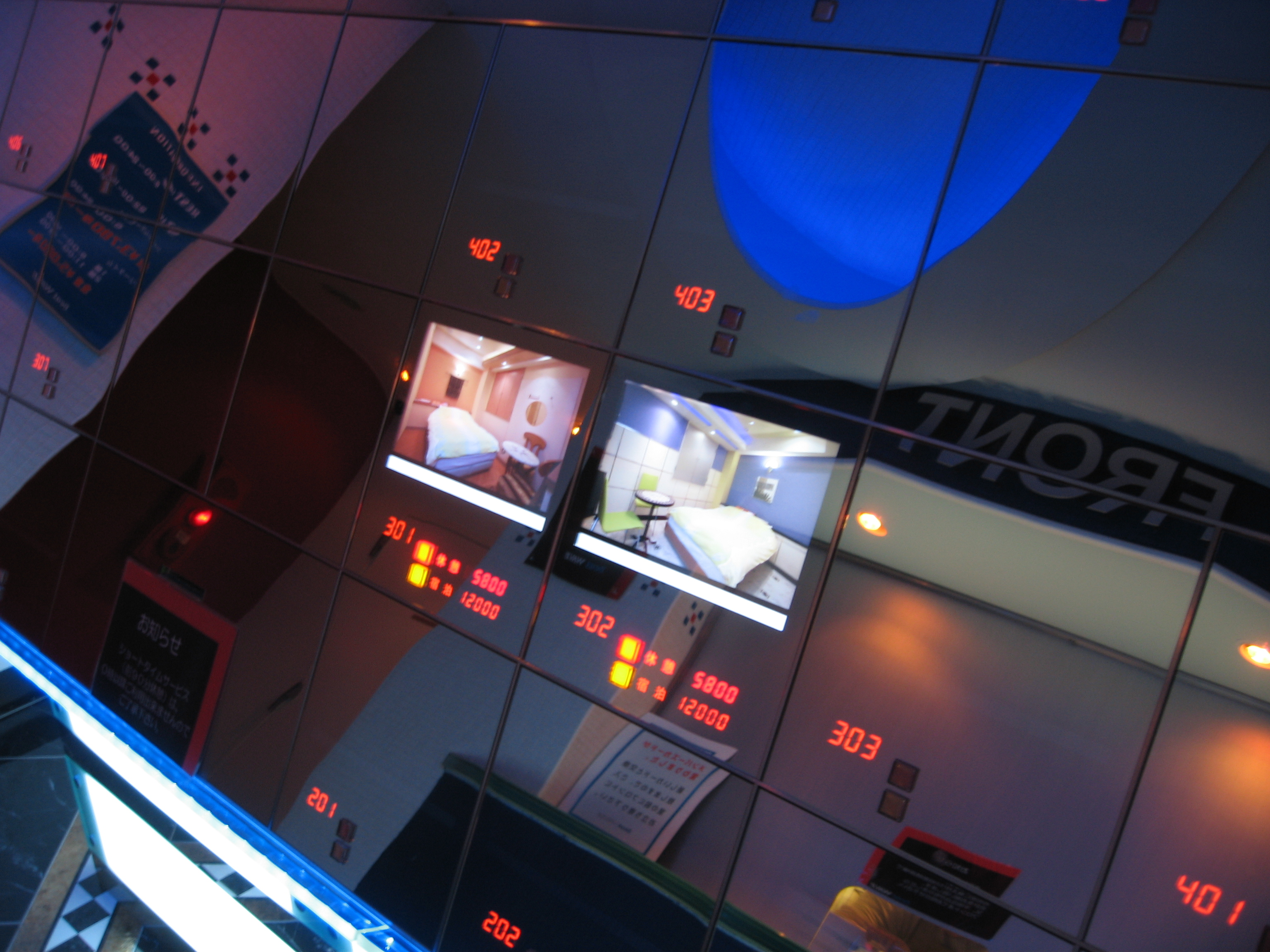
Discreet room selection

The history of love hotels (ラブホテル, rabu hoteru) can be traced back to the 17th century, in the early Edo period, when establishments appearing to be inns or teahouses with particular procedures for a discreet entry or even with secret tunnels for a discreet exit were built in Edo and in Kyoto. Modern love hotels developed from the chaya (茶屋) tea rooms used mostly by prostitutes and their clients but also by lovers. After World War II, the term tsurekomi yado (連れ込み宿, lit. "bring-along inn") was adopted, originally for simple lodgings run by families with a few rooms to spare. These establishments appeared first around Ueno, Tokyo in part due to demand from Occupation forces, and boomed after 1958 when legal prostitution was abolished and the trade moved underground.

The introduction of the automobile in the 1960s brought with it the "motel" and further spread the concept. Japanese housing trends at the time were characterized by small homes with sleeping areas being used as common areas during the day and, as a result, little opportunity for parents to engage privately in intercourse. Married couples therefore, began to frequent love hotels. By 1961, there were around 2,700 tsurekomi inns in central Tokyo alone. Hotels of the time featured unusual attractions such as swings and vibrating beds. The Meguro Emperor, the first castle-style love hotel, opened in 1973 and brought in an average of approximately ¥40 million monthly.

In 1984, the Businesses Affecting Public Morals Regulation Law placed love hotels under the jurisdiction of the police. For that reason, new hotels were built to avoid being classified as "love hotels"; the garish, over-the-top, bizarre designs and features of the past were significantly downplayed. Beginning in the 1980s, love hotels were also increasingly marketed toward women. A 2013 study showed that couples' selections of rooms at love hotels were made by women roughly 90% of the time. The Businesses Affecting Public Morals Regulation Law was amended in 2010, imposing even stricter limitations and blurring the line between regular hotels and love hotels. Keeping in mind legislation and a desire to seem more fashionable than competitors, an ever-changing palette of terms is used by hotel operators. Alternative names include "romance hotel", "fashion hotel", "leisure hotel", "amusement hotel", "couples hotel", and "boutique hotel".

Love hotels have enough cultural significance to be added to the first edition of emojis in Unicode 6.0.

=== South Korea ===
Love hotels (Korean: 러브호텔), also known as love motels, first appeared in South Korea in the mid-1980s. They were originally called "Parktel" (Korean: 박텔). Their boom and growth was originally attributed to the 1988 Olympics which took place in Seoul. The hotels have historically been seen as seedy, with some residents speaking out against them and not wanting them within certain distances of schools and residential areas. Some hotel owners have tried to remove that element from their business by upgrading, offering cleaner modern services, and removing some of the more sexual elements from their decor. They are considered a taboo topic in South Korea and a photo exhibit of love motels taken by a foreigner created a controversy in 2010.

=== Thailand ===
Thailand has had love motels since 1935 and there are approximately 100 establishments in Bangkok most densely located around Ratchadaphisek Road. The government no longer issues building permits for these types of motels, but some businesses work around the laws. In addition to short-stay, the motels are also used by foreign travellers on a budget.

=== Other countries ===
Similar establishments also exist in other Asian countries including for example Singapore, Taiwan and Hong Kong. India's first love hotel opened in 2015.

The same concept also exists in Central and South America. In Guatemala, they are called autohotels; in Chile motel or hotel parejero ('couples' hotel'); in the Dominican Republic, cabañas, moteles or estaderos; in Panama they are called casas de citas, moteles, casas de ocasion, push buttons or push for short; in Argentina and Uruguay, albergue transitorio or more informally, telo, which is hotel in reverse. In Mexico, Brazil, Colombia, Ecuador and Puerto Rico, they are simply called motels (the word is exclusively used for love hotels). In Brazil motels (approximately 5,000) are part of the urban landscape. Very popular, they are associated with erotic transgression, but also with romantic love. They usually offer protected parking and, from long before the video era, contactless check-in.

In Panama, love hotels were first opened in the 1950s. They are often (but not always) fenced with painted opaque walls and are nondescript, are arranged like large outdoor self-storage facilities, rooms have their own garage, and guests can only enter the hotel and its garages while inside a car. They are also used as regular motels. Inside the garage is the door that leads to the room, its price and a "push button" that unlocks the door of the room when pressed or "pushed".

In Nigeria, love hotels are called short-time. They are often low-budget accommodations in densely populated areas. Some other hotels offer "short-time" services unofficially.

In the United States and Canada, certain motels in low-income areas often serve similar functions as a Japanese love hotel. Colloquially known as "no-tell motels" or "hot-sheets joints", these are becoming scarce as local laws increasingly require renters' identification information to be recorded and given to law enforcement agencies. However, the US Supreme Court struck down warrantless searches of hotel records in 2015. In the early 21st century, various adult establishments such as strip clubs, adult arcades, and x-rated book and video stores, sometimes offer rooms with a little privacy for an hourly fee, no ID required. In Miami-Dade County, a chain of hourly-rate motels announces openly that their rooms are intended for sex, sometimes with parking in a garage with a door, with the room on top of the garage. Identification is generally required. In the Midwestern United States, a chain of short-to-overnight-stay hotels, Sybaris Pool Suites, offer only rooms with varying luxuries for couples, including swimming pools, whirlpools, saunas, and even waterfalls, along with large beds and lounging areas, and their marketing exclusively focuses on couples, never using the term "hotel", much less "love hotel".

In Oceania, New Zealand opened its first love hotel in May 2011, and Australia opened its first love hotel in August 2011.

== Economic aspects ==
The annual revenue of the love hotel industry in Japan was estimated in 2009 at more than $40 billion, a figure double that of Japan's anime market.

It is estimated that more than 500 million visits to Japan's 37,000 love hotels take place each year, which is the equivalent of around 1.4 million couples, or 2% of Japan's population, visiting a love hotel each day. In recent years, the love hotel business has drawn the interest of the structured finance industry.

Several transactions have been completed where the cash flows from a number of such hotels have been securitised and sold to international investors and buy-out funds.

== See also ==
- Day room (hotel)
- List of hotels
- List of human habitation forms
- Venereum
