= Day room (hotel) =

Method of booking a hotel room for same-day use

A day room (or day use) is a method of booking a hotel room for same-day use.

== History ==
Historically, the use of day rooms dates as far back as the hotel itself. In literary history, has been associated with the idea of renting rooms on an hourly basis. For a time, this practice had a negative connotation for hotels and motels. In Japan, this practice is commonplace, but exclusive to a specific type of hotel called a love hotel.

Long layovers and unpredictable travel plans re-created the demand for day rooms in modern times. In the United States, jobs that require travel became more popular in the 20th and 21st centuries. The practice of renting a hotel room for a day is also common among travelers and vacationers who go on cruises, as well as commuters visiting cities for conferences and those with long layovers, due to the fact that cruise ships typically depart and arrive at early hours of the morning. This is usually more affordable than booking a hotel overnight.

Day rooms are now being used for charitable work as well. Homeless shelters in the United States typically allow the homeless to sleep at night, but do not allow individuals to stay in the shelter during the day. In Montana, missions are investing in day room facilities to allow the homeless to work on computers, dress, and prepare for interviews. One facility in Montana provides bunks as well as common areas and showers to help impoverished individuals get back on their feet.

Modern hotels fill daytime occupancy by offering day rooms. Day rooms are booked in a block of hours typically between 8 am and 5 pm, before the typical night shift. For example, the Four Points, a Sheraton hotel in Los Angeles, began offering day rooms. RoomForDay is a European booking platform dedicated to day-use hotel stays; by early 2015 it listed more than 500 three- to five-star hotels in seven countries.

== Technology ==
There is a technology movement surrounding travel and time-saving that implements daytime hotel use. Several companies offer mobile applications that divide the time by hours or day use for travel purposes. In San Francisco, a company has created a mobile application that divides time in a hotel by the minute. In the Netherlands, the initiative VoorDeThuiswerkers was set up during the lockdown to help home workers and hotels through the corona crisis. Apart from the western world, in Asia (Hong Kong, Singapore and Malaysia) there's also number of similar platforms arising to cope with the hourly demand for business traveller such as Flow and Stayr.

Hotels converted their rooms into workplace for a day, because of the COVID-19 pandemic, many rooms were empty.

As of 2016, new businesses are built around the concept of helping travelers find day rooms. The IT movement in this direction typically list hotels and motels that offer day room services and provide booking information for those facilities before evening bookings.
