= Venereum =

Element of ancient Roman private apartments

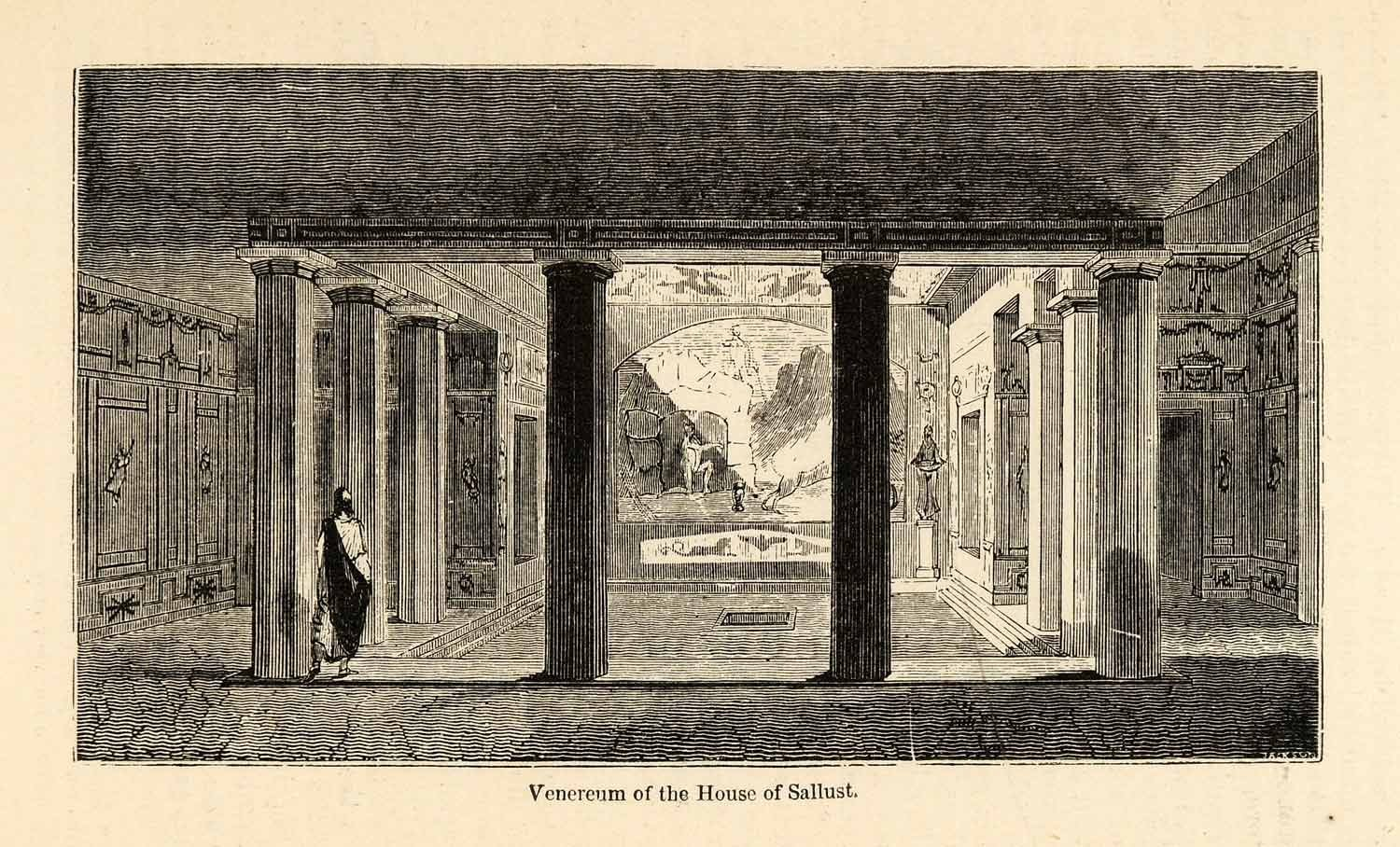
A venereum in the House of Sallust

Venereum (after goddess Venus) was an element of ancient Roman private apartments found particularly in Pompeii. It was originally interpreted as a specialized apartment or room dedicated to sexual activities. One venereum was found in the House of Julia Felix and another one in the House of Sallust, both in Pompeii. In the latter house, the venereum was a garden with several separate rooms.

A Latin inscription in the House of Julia Felix reports that "on the estate of Julia Felix... a venereum", among other things, was "to be let for a term of five continuous years, from the first to the sixth of the Ides of August". The accompanying abbreviation SQDLENC is conjectured to stand for "Si quis domi lenocinium exerceat ne conducito" ("Let no one apply who keeps a brothel"). The venereum in the House of Sallustius included a bedchamber, a triclinium and a lararium.
