= Engawa =

Edging strip in Japanese architecture

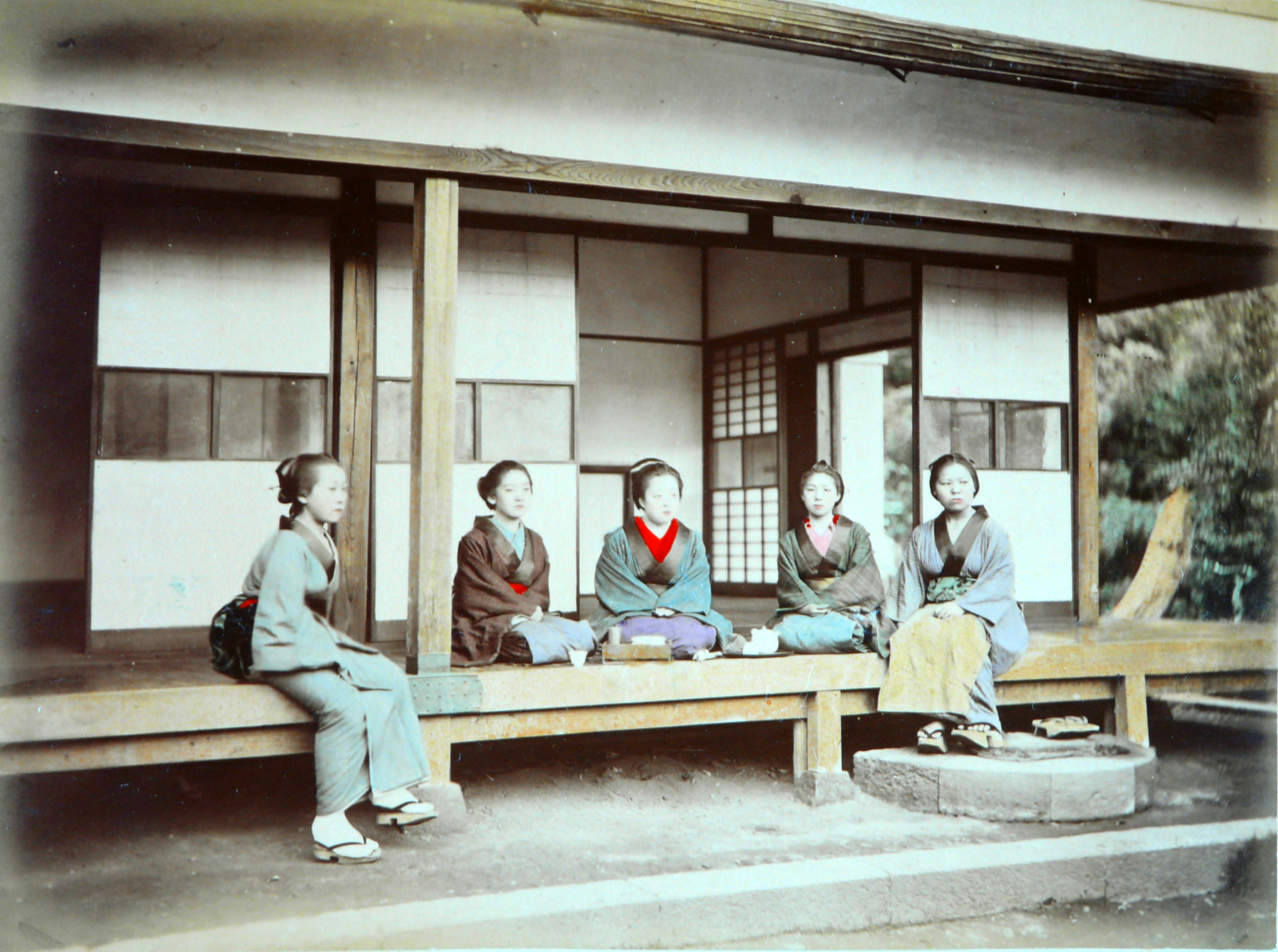
A Meiji era engawa bearing a resemblance to a veranda, with people for scale. Note the slope of the ground under the engawa, and the traditional stone step.

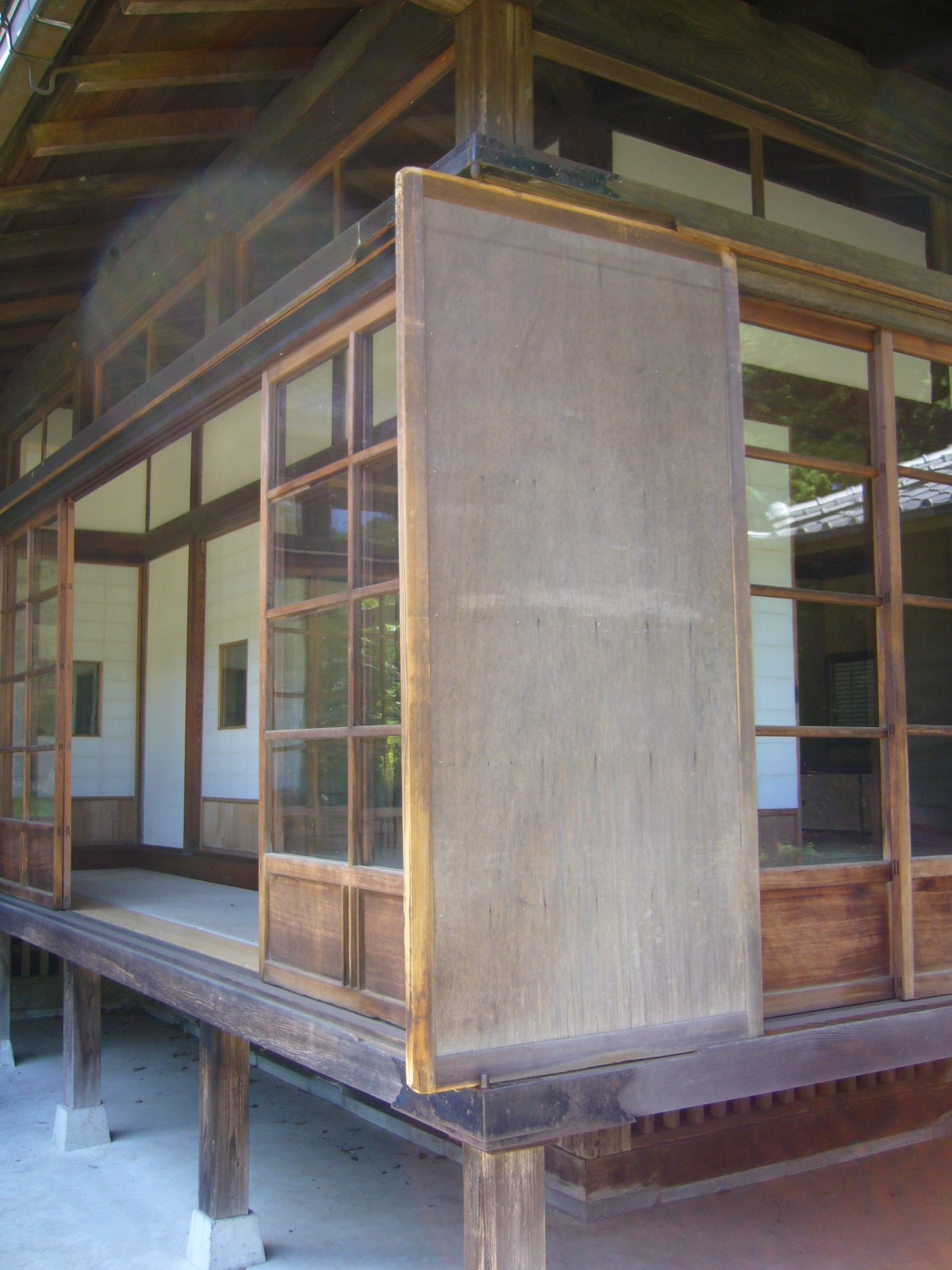
Engawa, with sliding glass doors outside, and yukimi shōji (shōji with both paper and glass panes) inside. The solid wood amado leaning up against the corner is a storm shutter, and is usually stored away.

An engawa (縁側/掾側) or en (縁) is an edging strip of non-tatami-matted flooring in Japanese architecture, usually wood or bamboo. The en may run around the rooms, on the outside of the building, in which case they form a veranda that can be used as a porch or sunroom.

Usually, the en is outside the translucent paper shōji, but inside the amado (雨戸) storm shutters (when they are not packed away). However, some en run outside the amado. En that cannot be enclosed by amado, or sufficiently sheltered by eaves, must be finished to withstand the Japanese climate. Modern architecture often encloses an en with sheet glass. An engawa allows the building to remain open in the rain or sun, without getting too wet or hot, and allows flexible ventilation and sightlines.

The area under an engawa is sloped away from the building, and often paved, to carry water away. The area directly outside the paving is usually a collector drain that takes water still further away. The engawa is thus a way to bridge the obstacles good drainage puts between the indoors and the outdoors.

== Structure ==
The engawa is supported on posts, identical to the other uprights of the house. A row of uprights runs long the inside of the engawa, and the shōji sliding screens run between these; a second row of uprights runs along the outside of the engawa. The posts traditionally stand on half-buried stones, pounded into the earth with a specialized maul, and the wood posts shaped to fit the upper surface. More recent houses may use concrete footings.

The engawa floor may not be finished, or it may be polished or lacquered.

== Terminology ==
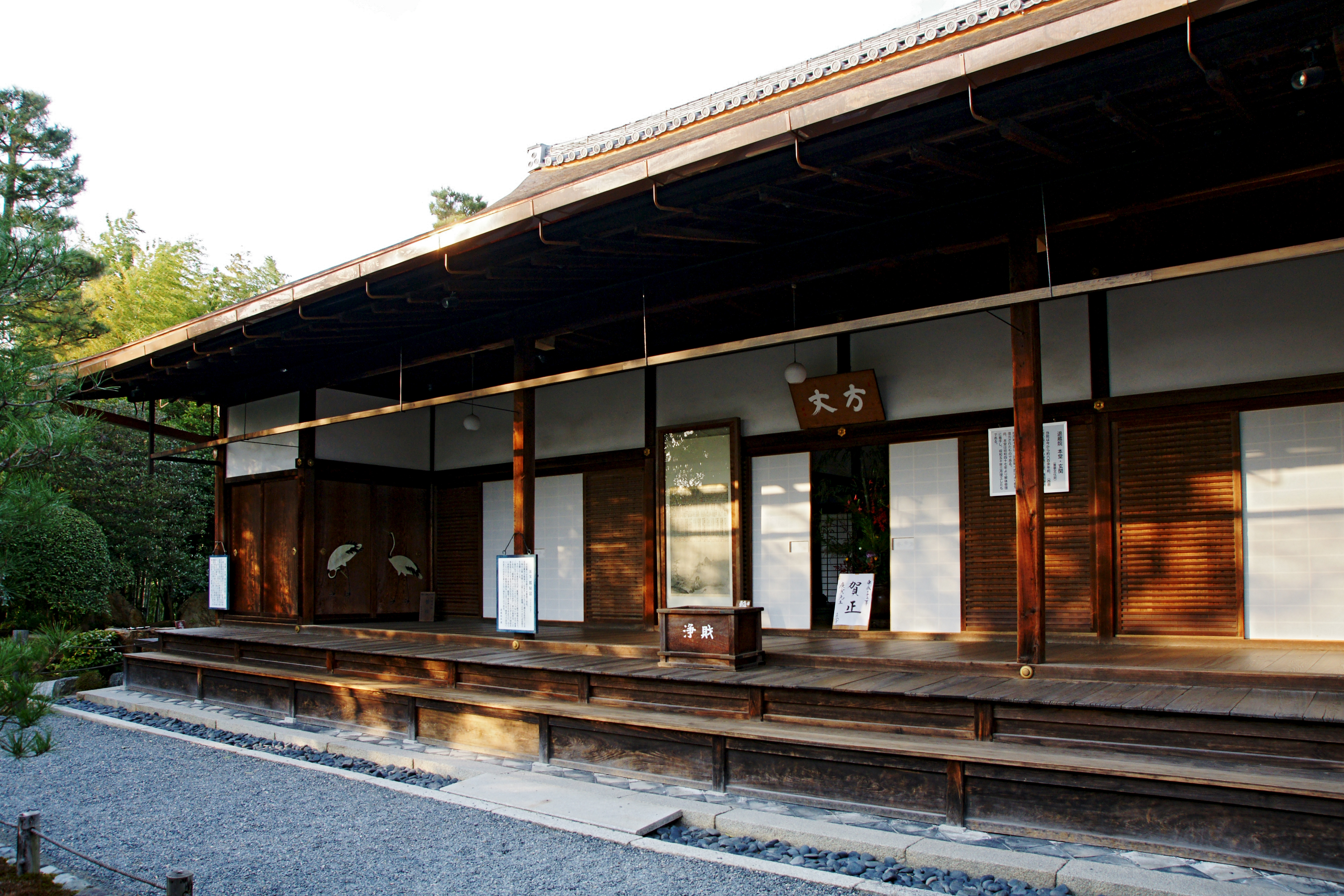
A temple in Kyoto with, from top to bottom, hiro-en, ochi-en, and nure'en. Note that part of the hiro-en is enclosed. Drainage provision is obvious.

En means an edge; gawa a side. The terms en and engawa were historically used interchangeably, but engawa now generally refers to the veranda directly outside the shutters. Types of en include:

=== Positional terms ===
- hiro-en (広縁), an inner en, possibly enclosed
- ochi-en (落縁), an en set one step below the floor (or en) inside it
- nure'en (濡れ縁, lit. 'a wet en'), an en protruding from under the eaves and not protected by amado.

If there are fewer than three en, an en may be described by more than one of the positional terms.

=== Structural terms ===
- mawari-en (回縁), a wrap-around en, often a wrap-around veranda
- kirime-en (切目縁), a en with boards running across its width
- kure-en (榑縁), a en with boards running along its length
- sunoko-en (簀子縁), a veranda with a slatted floor for better drainage
- takesunoko-en (竹簀の子縁), a bamboo sunoko-en
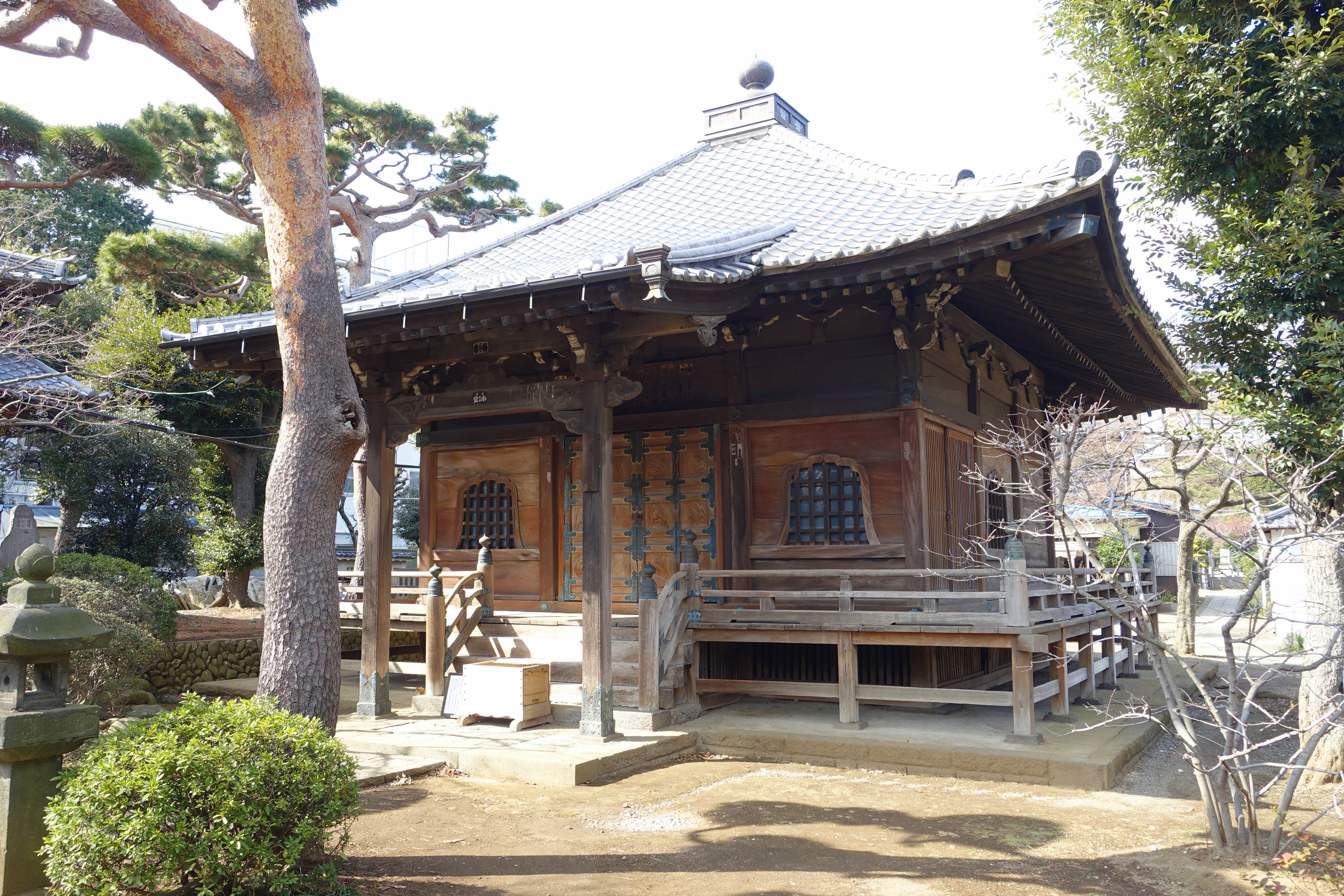
Mawari-en, an en which continues all around the building

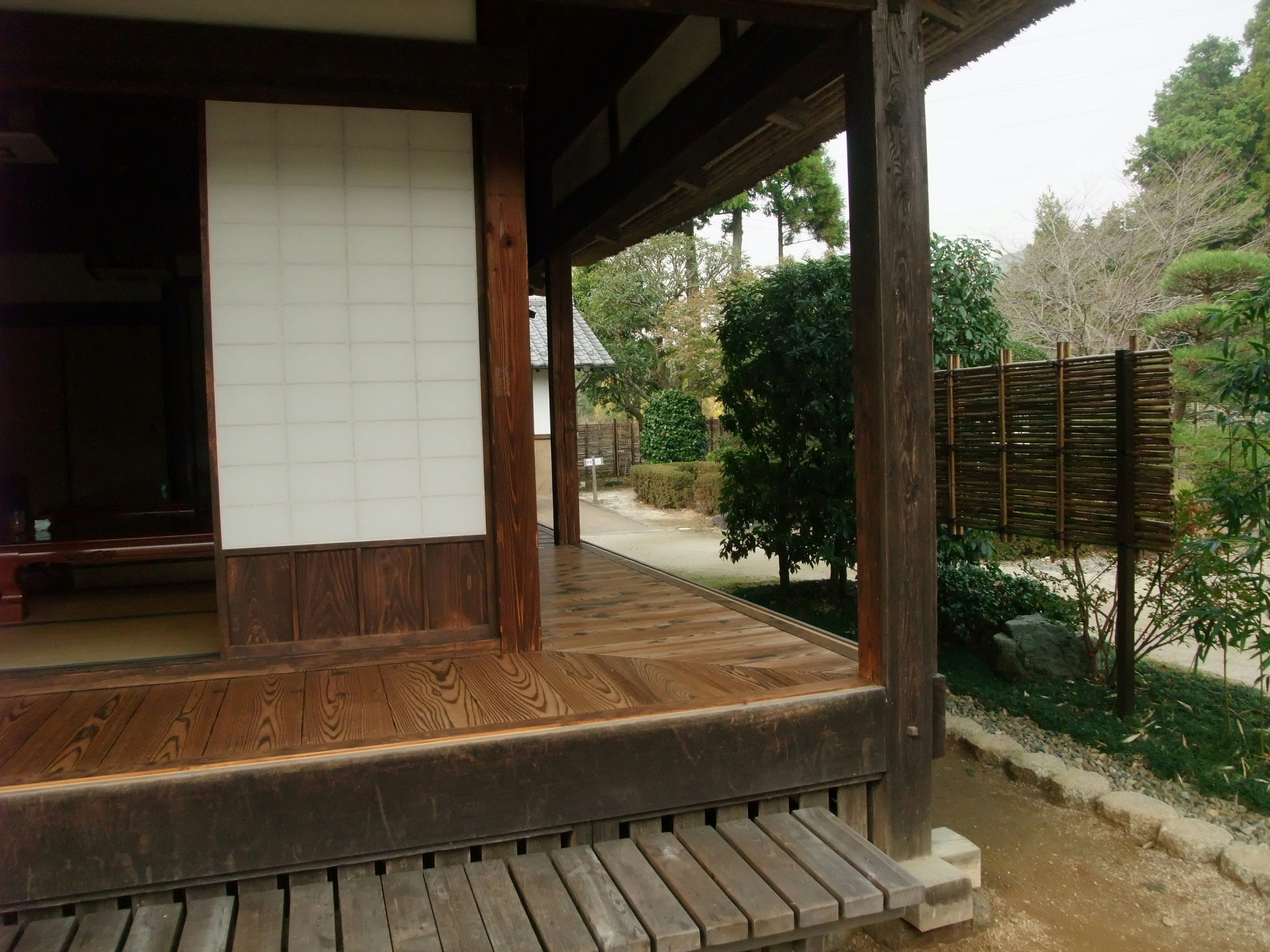
Kirime-en showing traditional mitered corner treatment. Sunoko-en in foreground.

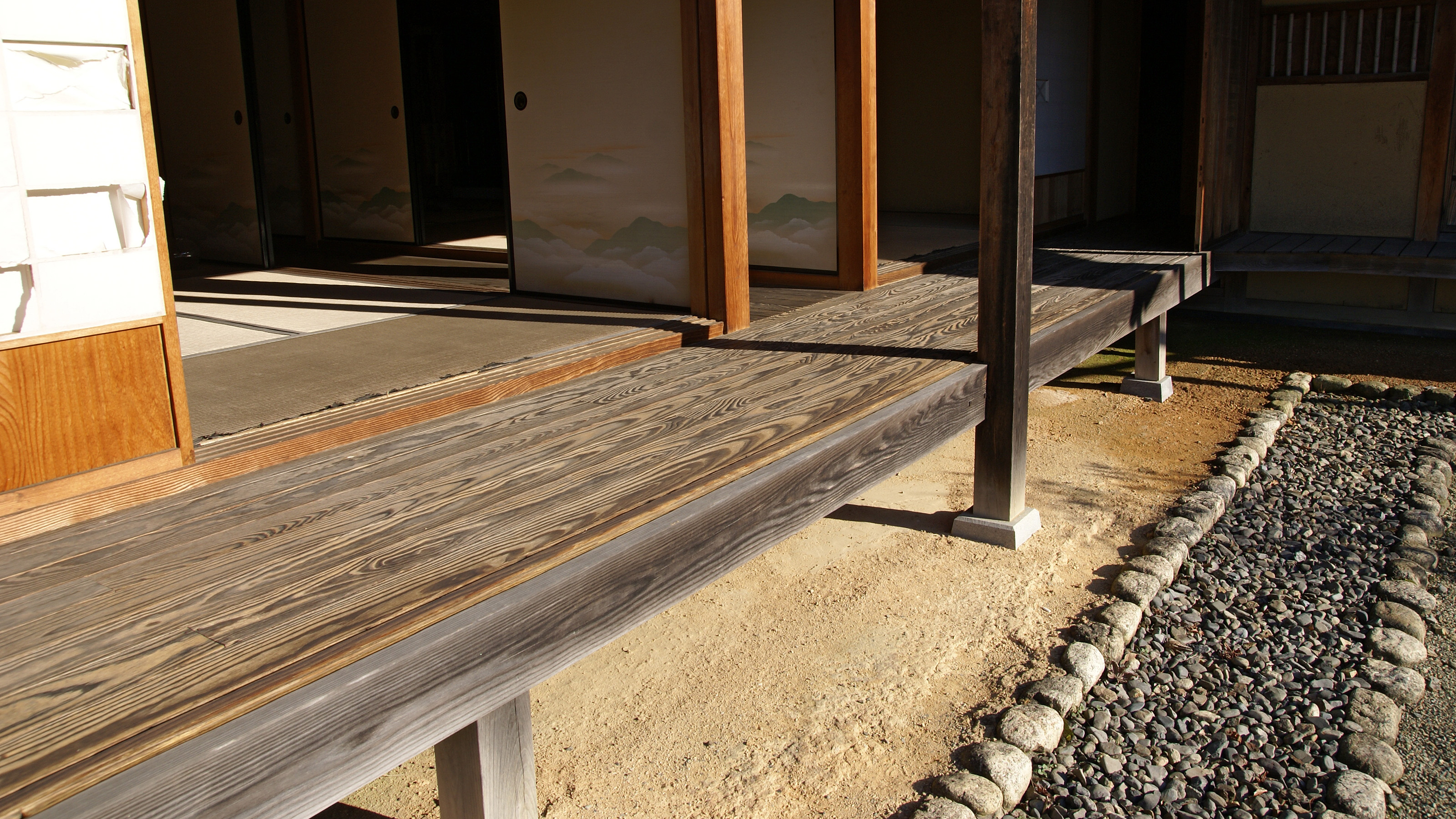
Kure-en. The gravel path may well double as a collector drain.

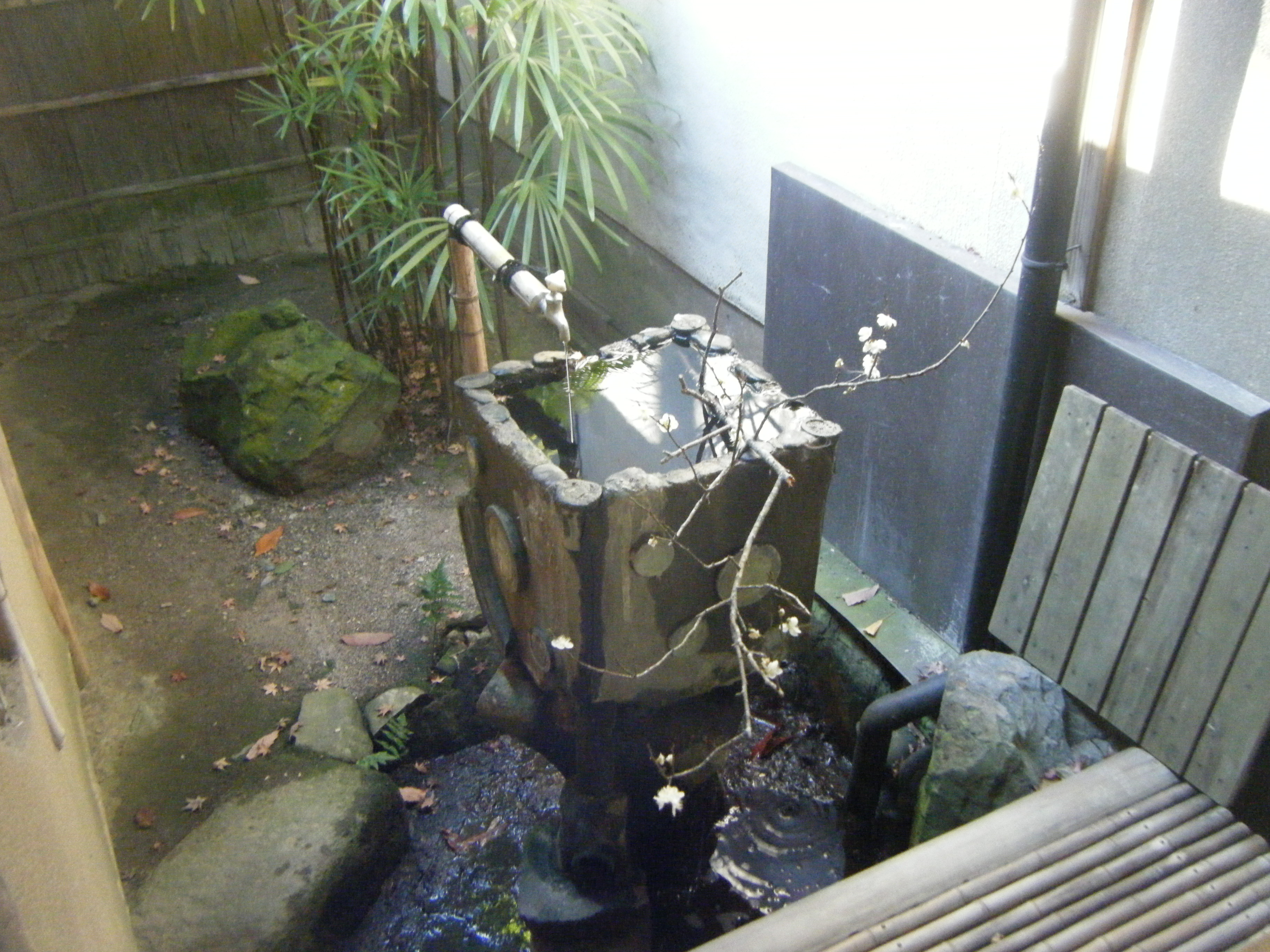
Fast-draining takesunoko-en in lower right corner, near a tap

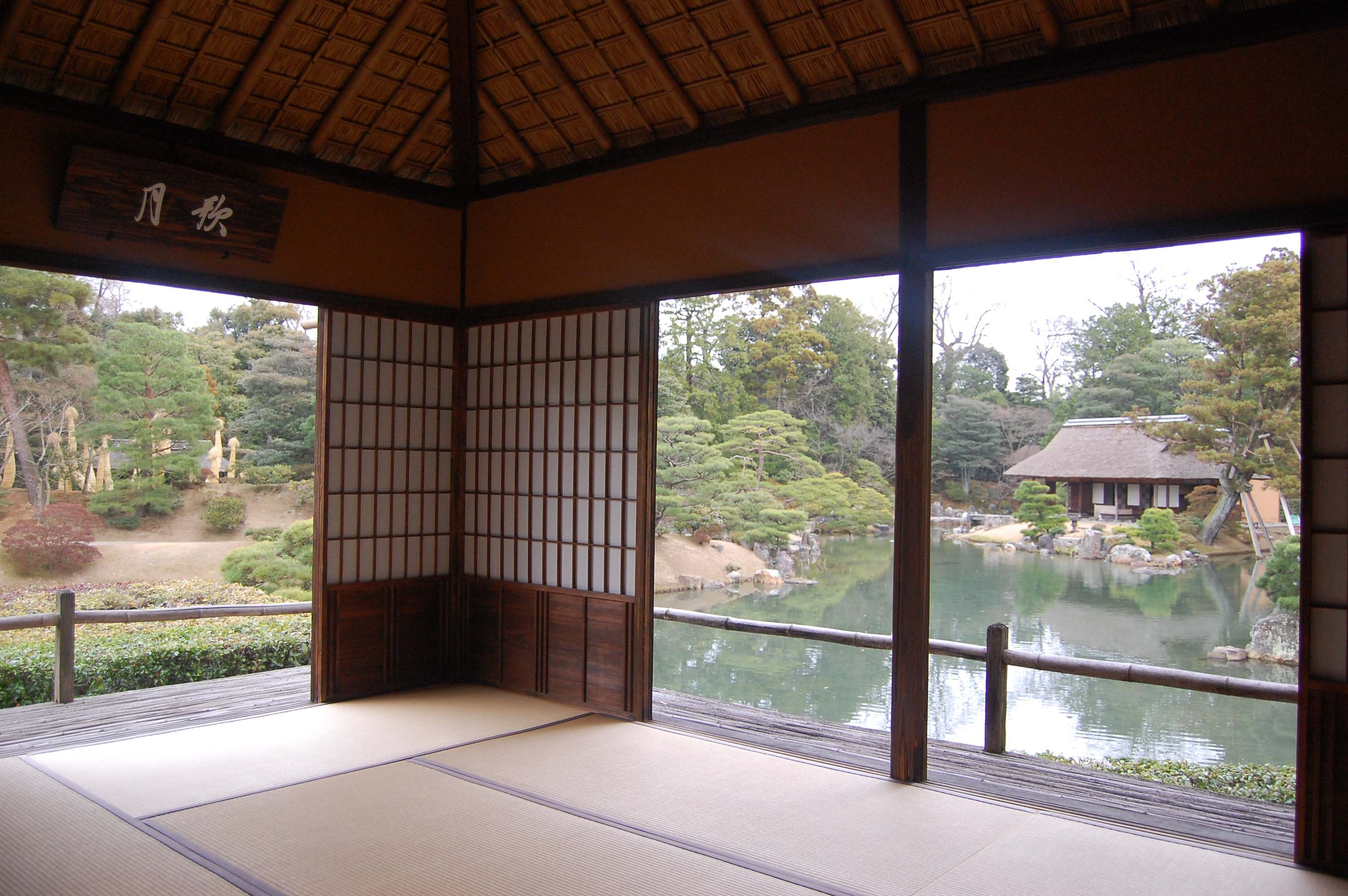
Takesunoko-en in the Geppa-rō rustic tea pavilion, overlooking the water at Katsura Imperial Villa (close-up, drainage)

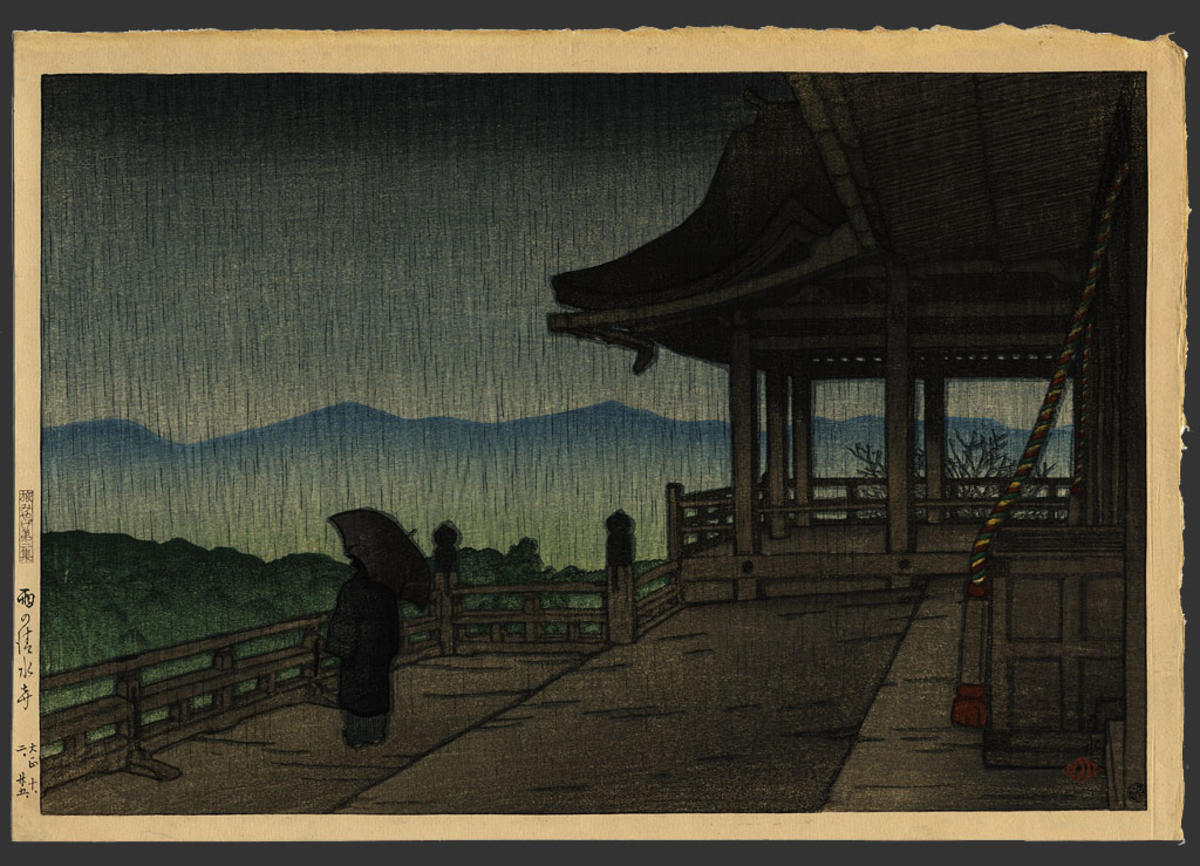
Broad nure-en at Kiyomizu-dera; the dry section may be seen to the right.

== Relation to other house components ==
The core of a traditional Shinden-style building was the innermost room or moya (母屋) (see diagram). This was surrounded by the hisashi (廂,庇), which was on the same level, and was usually inside the windows and shitomi storm shutters. The hisashi was often a ring of tatami-floored rooms, but could be an unmatted en; see also hirobisashi (広廂/広庇/弘廂). In a large building, there could be further layers of tatami-floored rooms, courtyards, and further floorplan complications.

In Shoin-style buildings, the positioning of the engawa varied more, and the storm shutters slid rather than being hinged (usually horizontally). The modern Sukiya-style of building uses amado, storm shutters that not only slide but pack away in a cupboard called a to-bukura by day; unlike the Shoin-style shutter, these generally run on the outside of the engawa.

The width of an engawa varies with the building; 1–1.3 m (3 ft 3 in – 4 ft 3 in) is common, while large temples may have over 3 metres (9.8 ft) of engawa. The engawa is supported on posts, identical to the other uprights of the house. The posts stand on half-buried stones or concrete footings.

Moya and hisashi. The hisashi may itself be an en in small buildings, or it may be a second layer of tatami-floored rooms, with a hard-floored en running outside it.

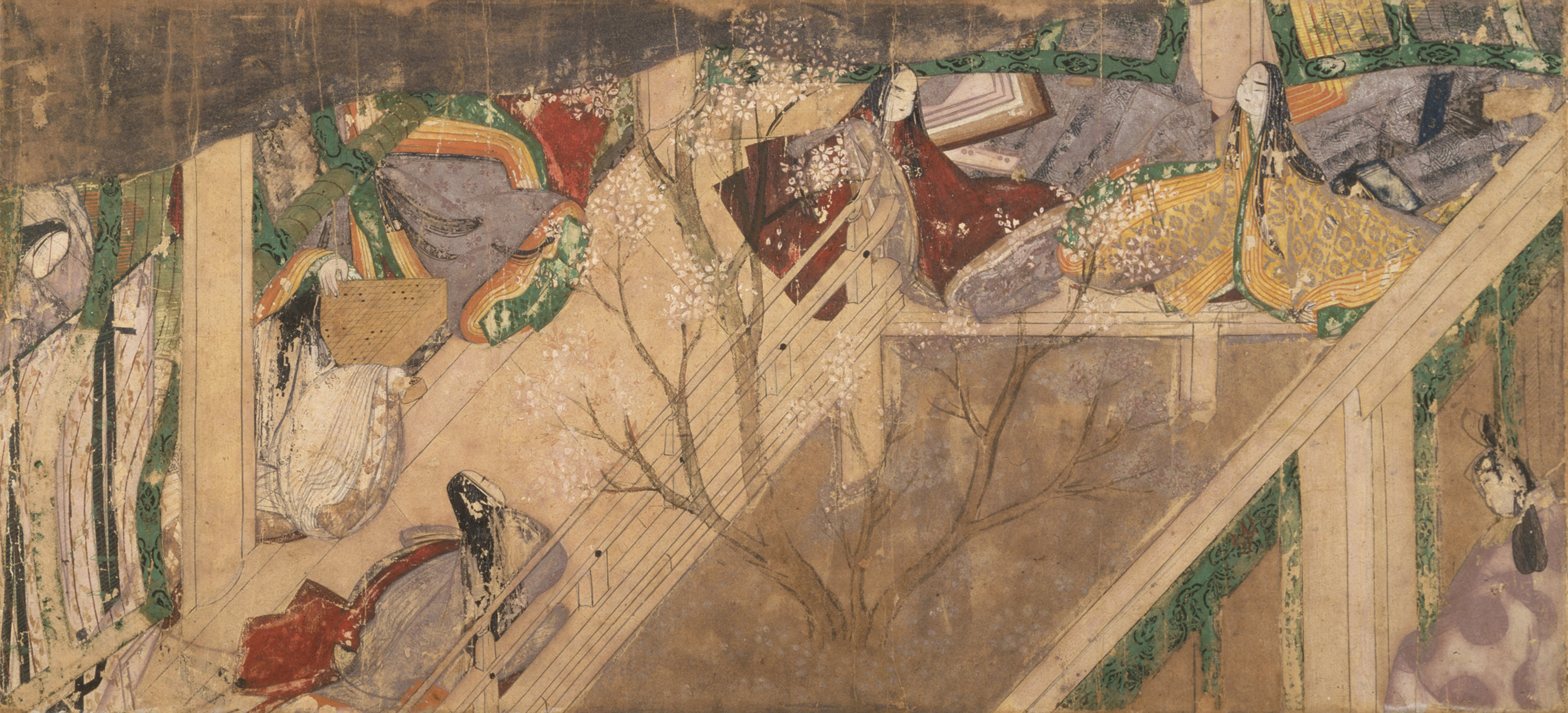
En looking onto a courtyard, illustration c. 1130

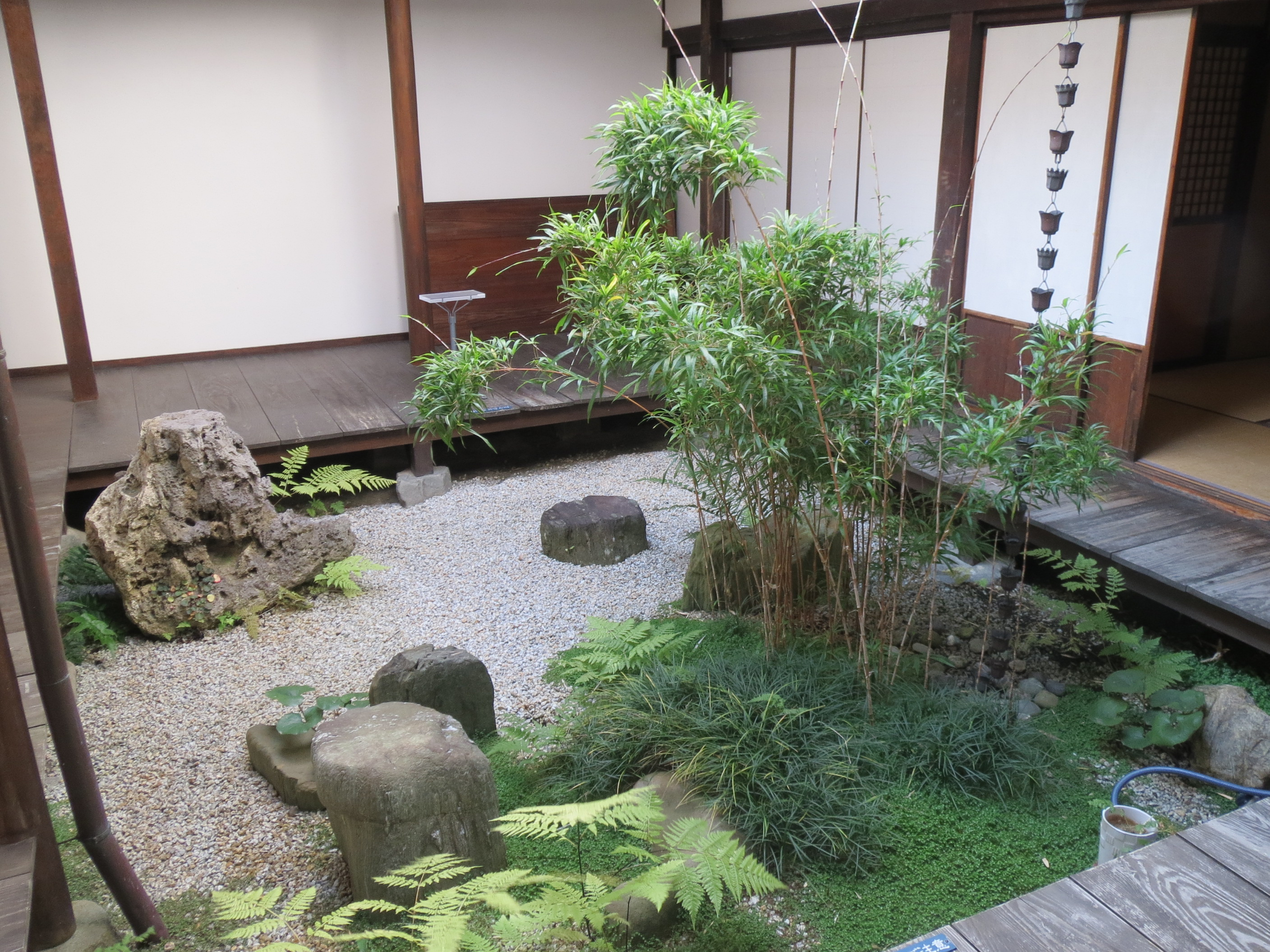
Low kirime-en running around a tsubo-niwa courtyard, 2012

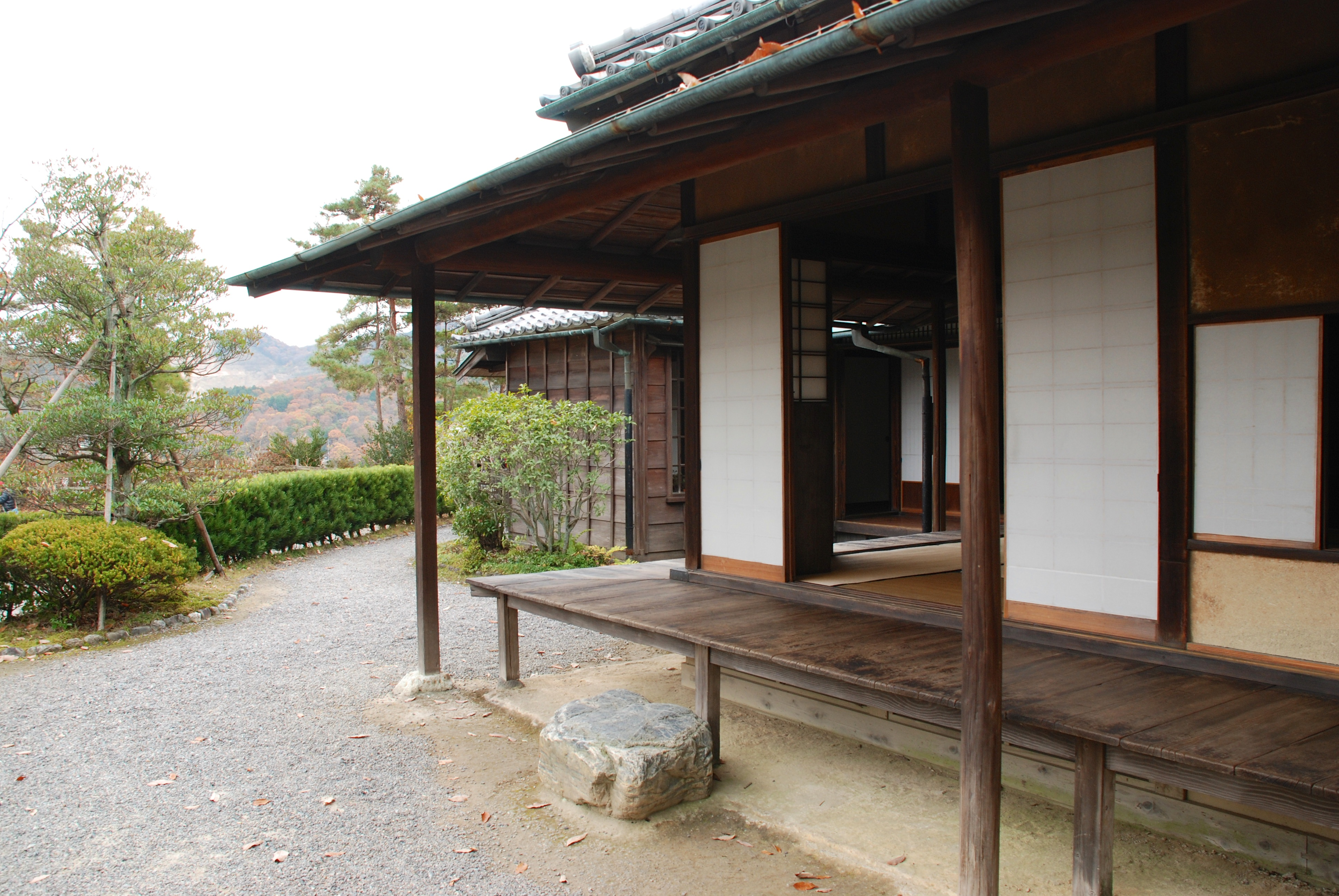
After rain; the eaves have kept the en mostly dry, and the en has kept the foundations of the house quite dry.

== Cultural role ==
Engawa are often proportioned so that one can sit on the edge and observe the garden. They provide a space for playing children and casual visitors.

An engawa is part of the house, and shoes are therefore not worn on it. Guests' shoes are lined up pointing outwards.

While engawa declined with the Westernization of Japanese architecture, they are making a comeback in modern architecture.

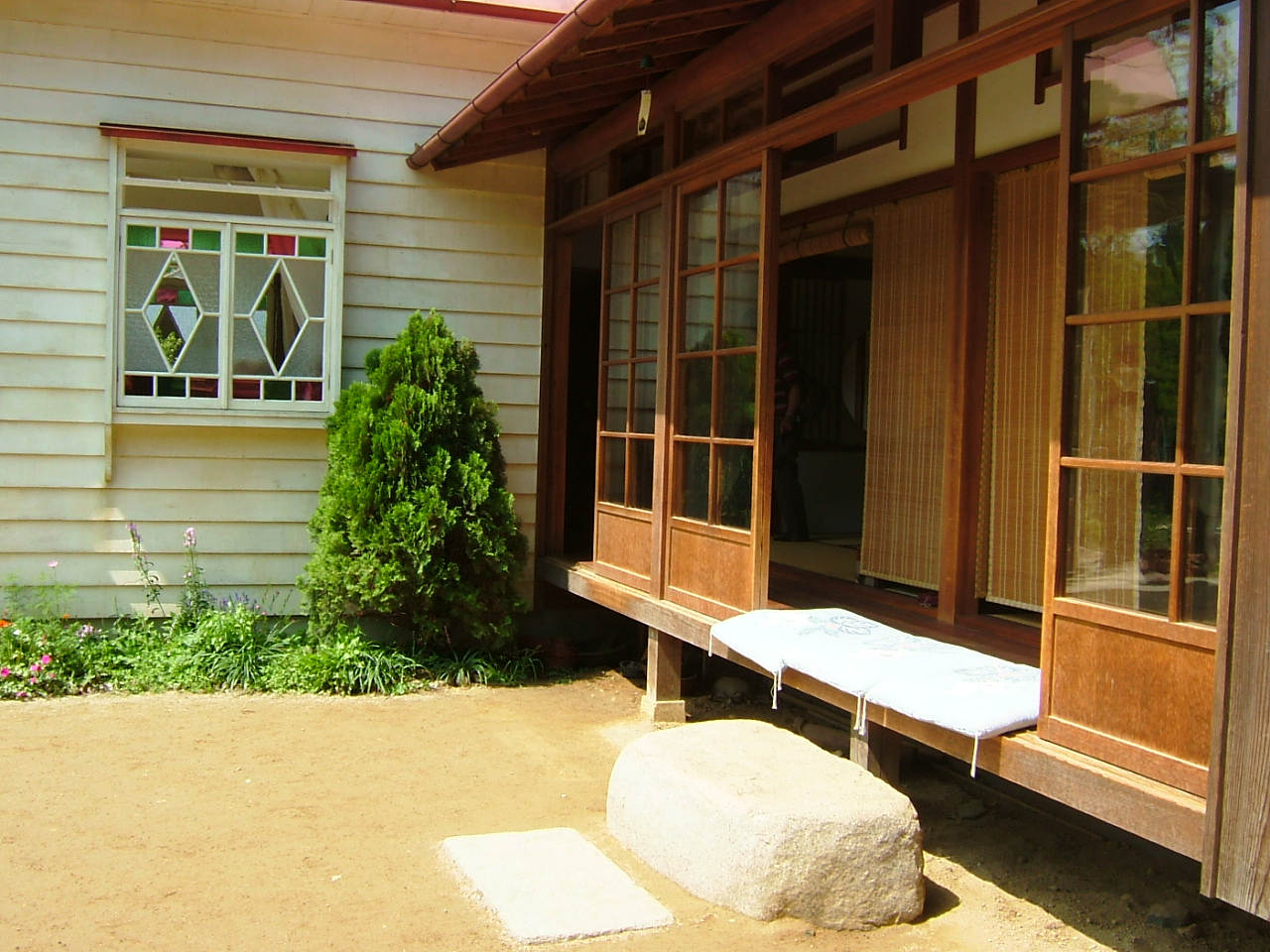
Cushions on an engawa protected by sliding glass doors. Note fume-ishi, stone step.

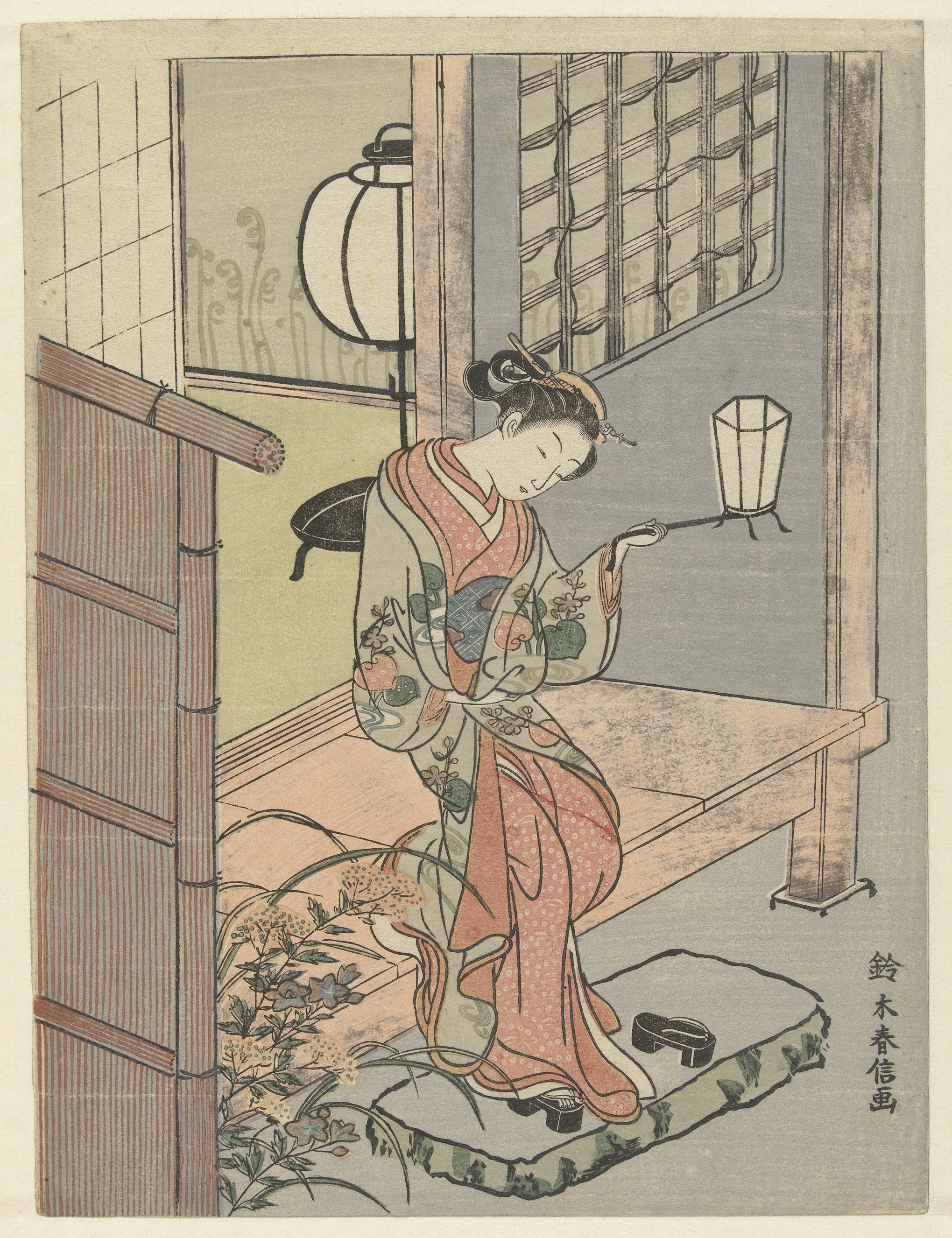
An engawa is part of the house, and shoes are therefore not worn on it.

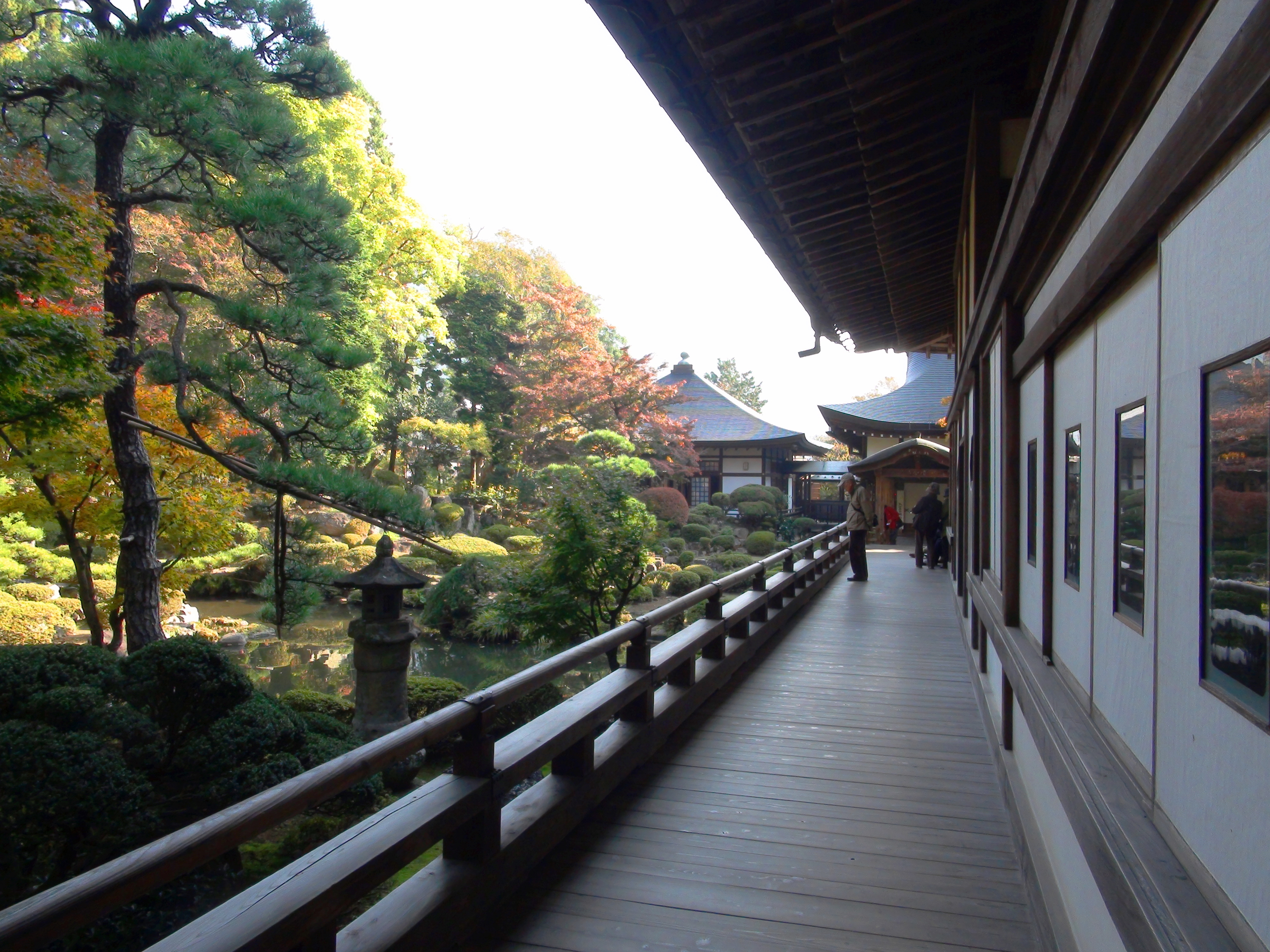
An engawa overlooking Erin-ji Gardens.

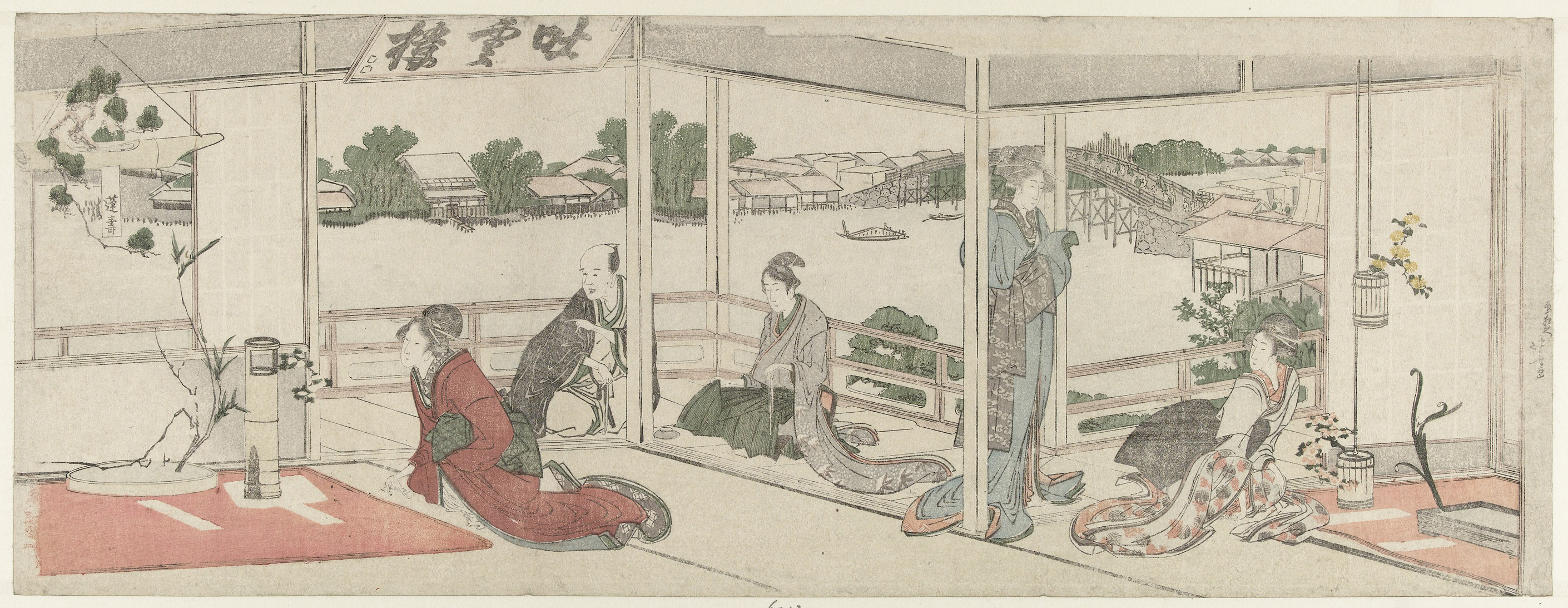
An engawa can open the house to the surrounding landscape.

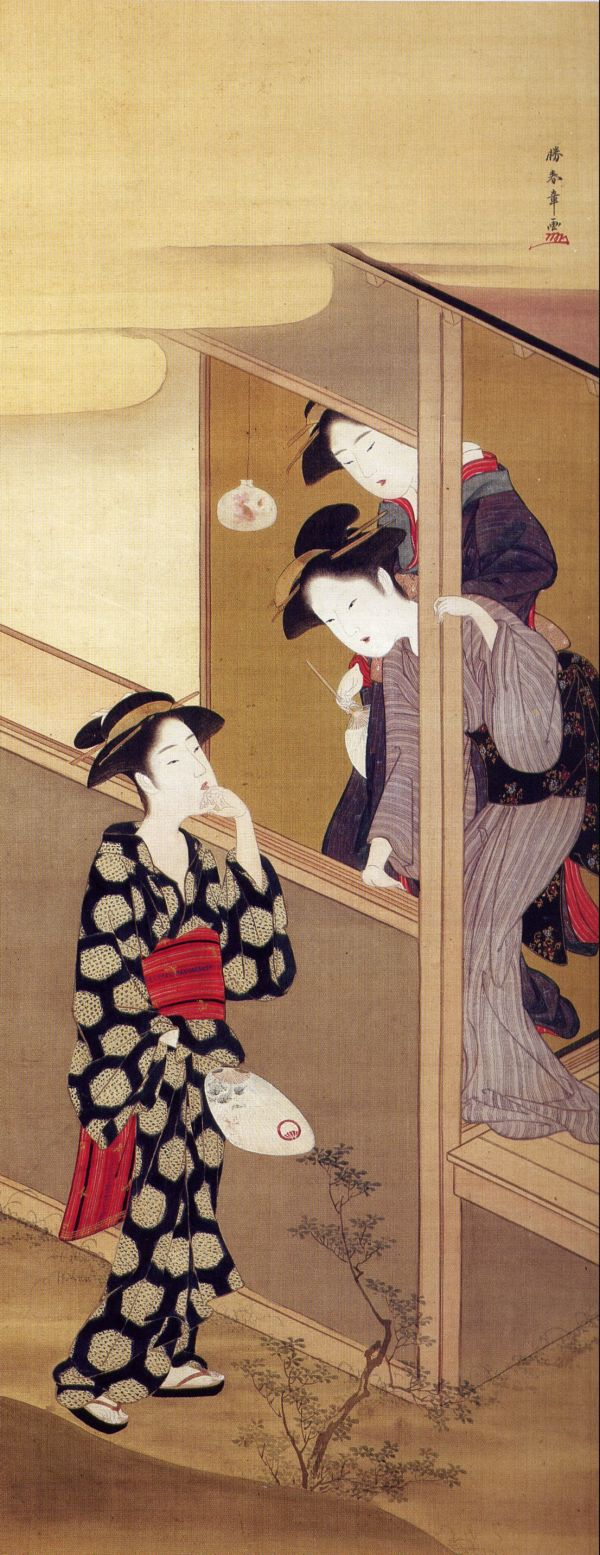
Socializing on an engawa.

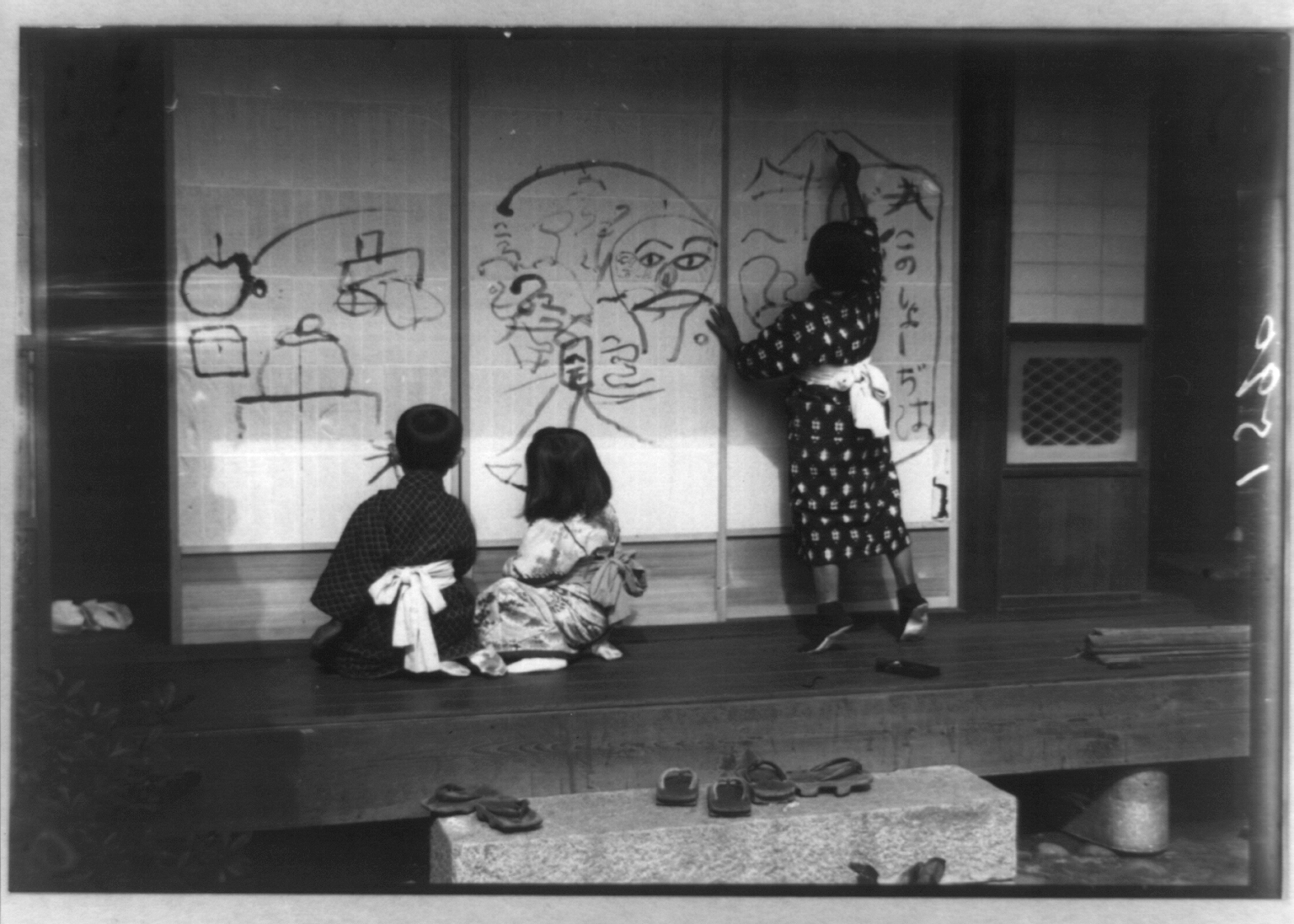
Children playing on an engawa; they are drawing on the shōji. Note shoes on fume-ishi.

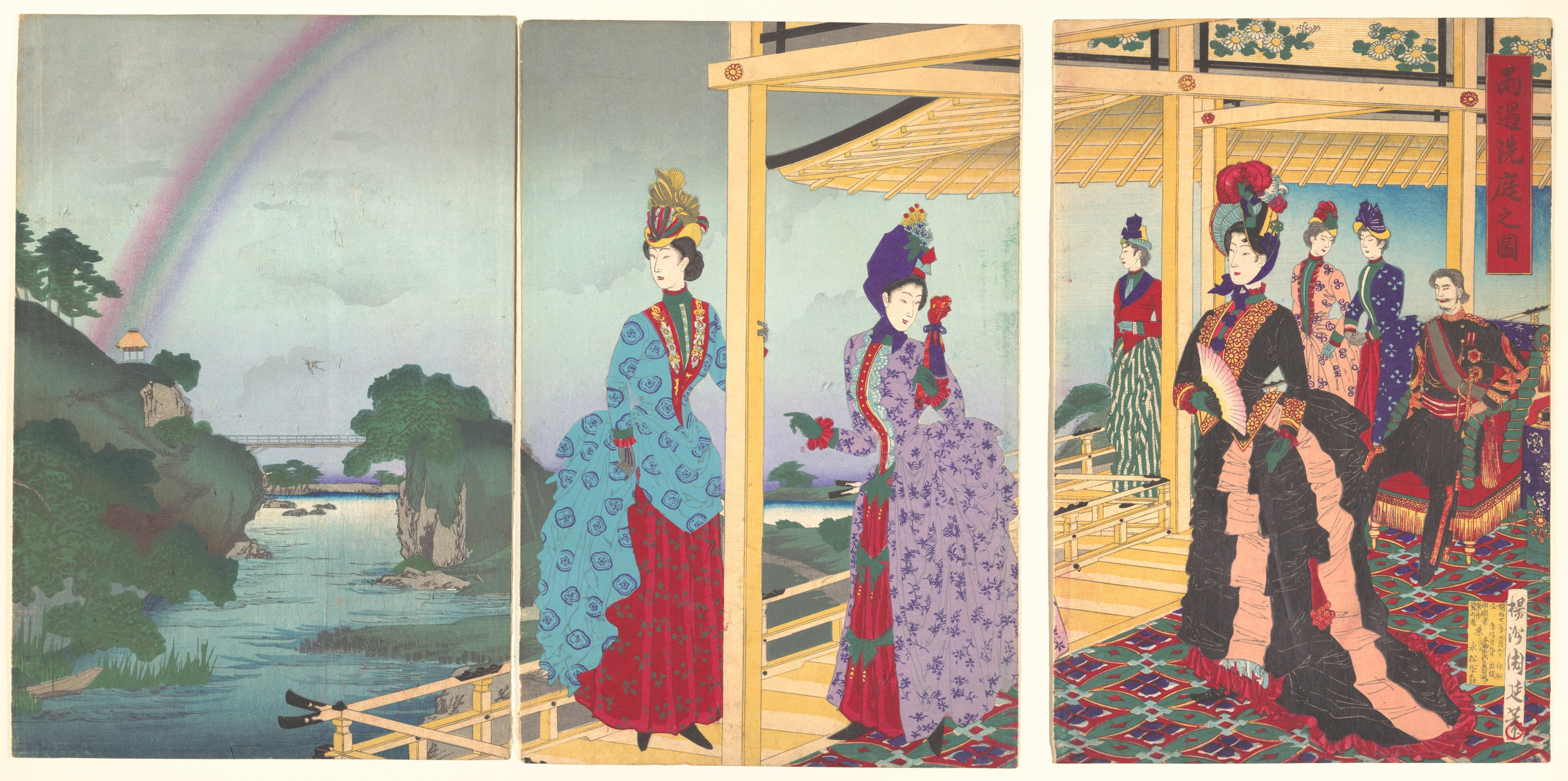
Traditional en in fancier buildings often have low railings, for leaning on while sitting on the en. Westernization of clothing made sitting on the floor difficult; modern en often have standing-height railings

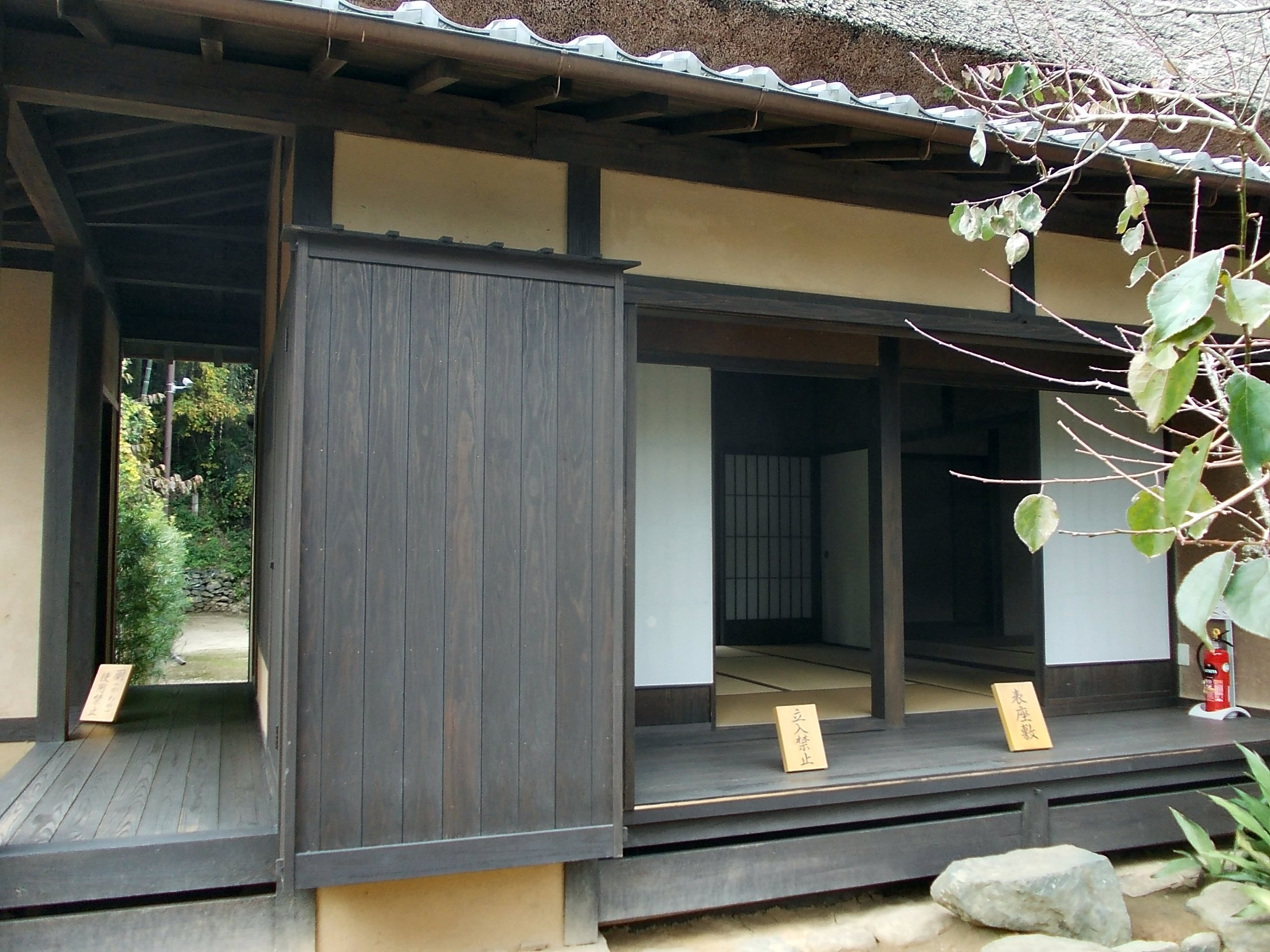
Left, an en running between buildings, joining them.

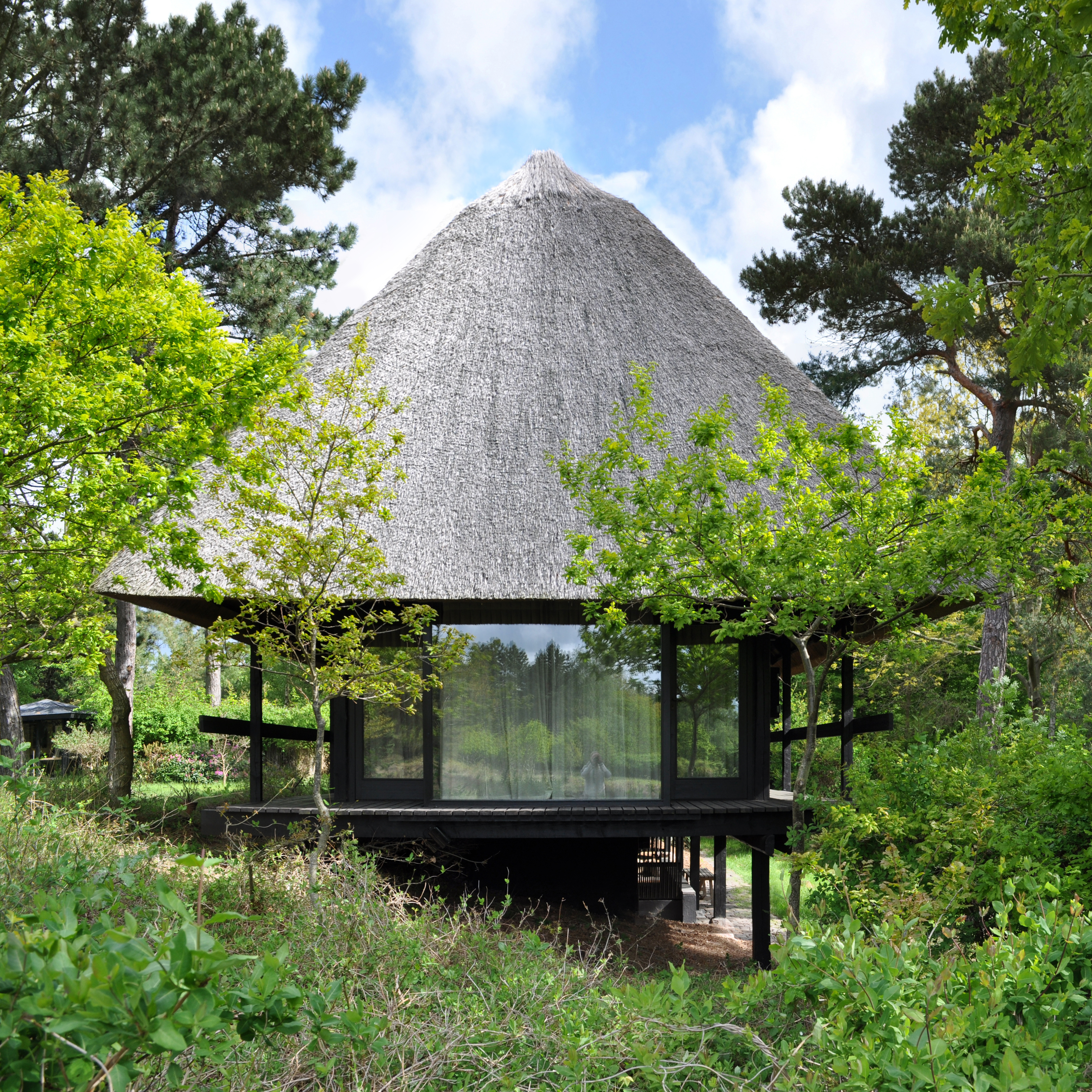
Modern mawari-en in Denmark.

== See also ==
- Loggia
- Bay window
- Oriel window
