= Amador =

Amador may refer to:

== People ==
- Amador (name)

== Places ==
- Amador County, California
- Amador City, California
- Amador, Panama
- Lake Amador, a reservoir
- Amador Valley, Alameda County, California
- Dougherty, Alameda County, California, formerly called Amador's
- Dublin, California, formerly called Amador
- Amador Township, Minnesota
- Fort Amador, a former U.S. Army post in Panama

== Other ==
- Amador (film), a 2010 Spanish film
- Amador, a fictional city in the Wheel of Time fantasy novel series
- Amador (football club), São Tomé and Príncipe
- USS Amador (AK-158), U.S. Navy cargo ship

== See also ==
- Amador Central Railroad, a defunct California railroad
