= Amado =

Amado may refer to:

== Places ==
- Amado, Arizona

== Name ==
- Amado Crowley (1930–2010), occult teacher and self-proclaimed illegitimate son of Aleister Crowley
- Amado Carrillo Fuentes (1956-1997), Mexican drug kingpin and former leader of the Juárez Cartel
- Amado Boudou (born 1963), Argentine politician and businessman, vice-president since 2011

== Surname ==
- Diogo Amado (born 1990), Portuguese football player
- Flávio Amado (born 1979), Angolan football player
- Jorge Amado (1912–2001), Brazilian writer
- Lauro Amadò (1912–1971), Swiss football player
- Luís Amado (born 1953), Portuguese politician
- Marijke Amado (born 1954), Dutch television presenter
- Miguel Amado (born 1984), Uruguayan football player

== Architecture ==
- Amado (architecture) (ja:雨戸), a kind of sliding window shutter in Japan.
