= Amador (name) =

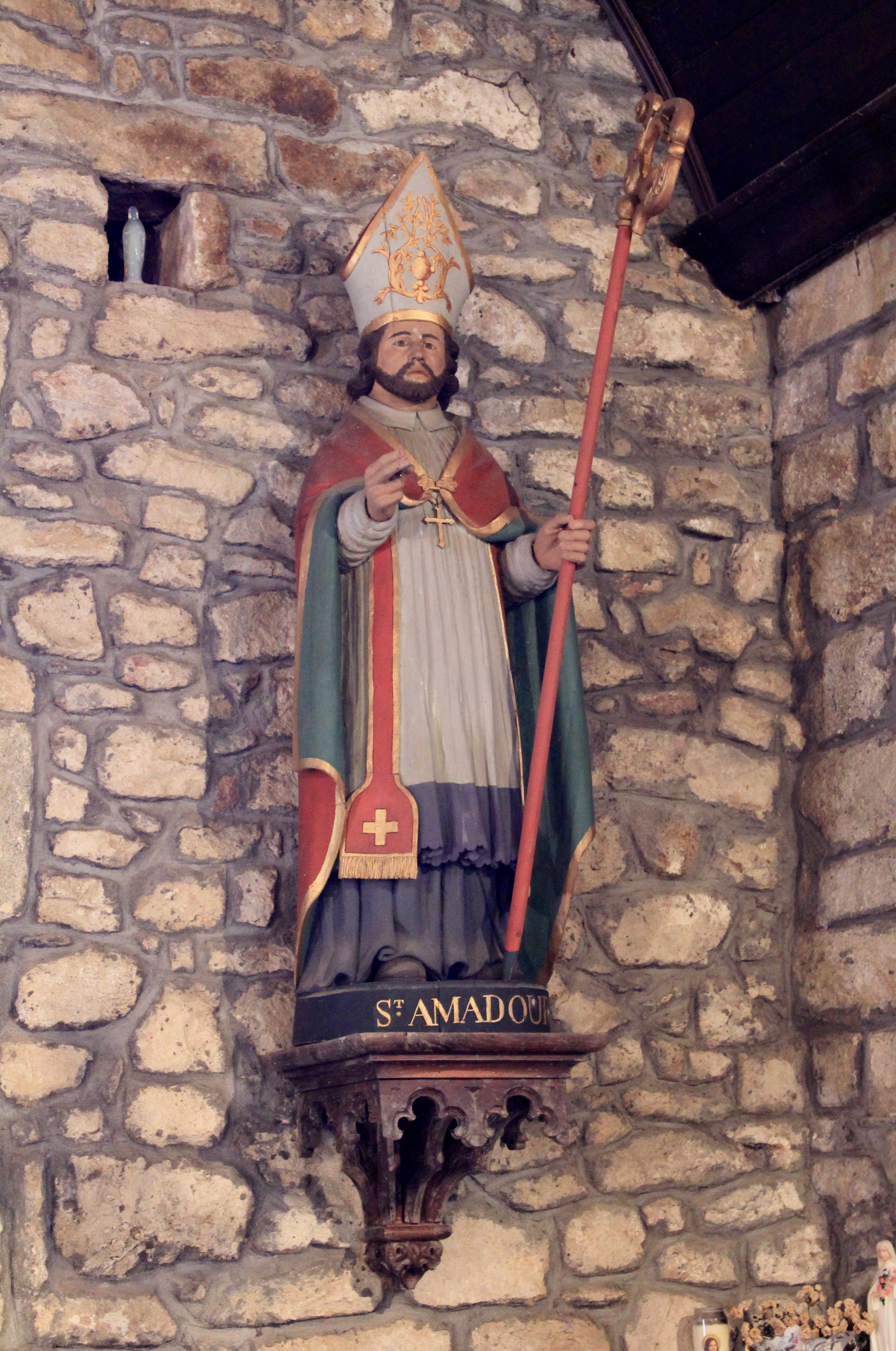
- Statue of Saint Amator
- Gender: Male

Origin
- Language: Latin
- Origin: amator
- Meaning: male lover

Amador, from Latin amator meaning "lover", is both a surname and a male given name. As a given name it usually refers to Saint Amator. Notable people with the name include:

Surname:

- Adael Amador (born 2003), Dominican professional baseball player
- Agustí Roc Amador (born 1971), Spanish ski-mountaineer and long-distance runner
- Andrey Amador (born 1986), Costa Rican road-bicycle racer
- Carlos Fonseca Amador (1936–1976) professor, politician, and Nicaraguan
- Guillermo Amador (born 1974), American musician
- Jose Maria Amador (1777–1883), rancher, miner, and businessman, for whom Amador City and Amador County, California are named
- Juan Valentín Amador (1793–1848), Mexican army general
- Manuel Amador Guerrero (1833–1909), first President of Panama
- Michael Amador, American musician and manager of The Fab Four
- Pinky Amador (born 1966), Filipina actress
- Ryan Amador, American singer-songwriter and LGBT rights advocate

Given name:

- King Amador (died 1596), insurgent on São Tomé
- Rafael Amador (born 1967), Mexican football defender
- Santos Amador (born 1982), Bolivian footballer
- Amador Álvarez (born 1945), Spanish politician
- Amador Bendayán (1920–1989), Venezuelan actor and entertainer
- Amador Bueno (c. 1572–between 1646 and 1650?), Spanish settler in Brazil and government official
- Amador Lugo Guadarrama (1921–2002), Mexican painter and engraver
- Amador Salazar (1868–1916), military leader in the Mexican Revolution

== See also ==
- Amado (disambiguation)
