= Amado (architecture) =

Fitting installed at an opening of a building for windproofing

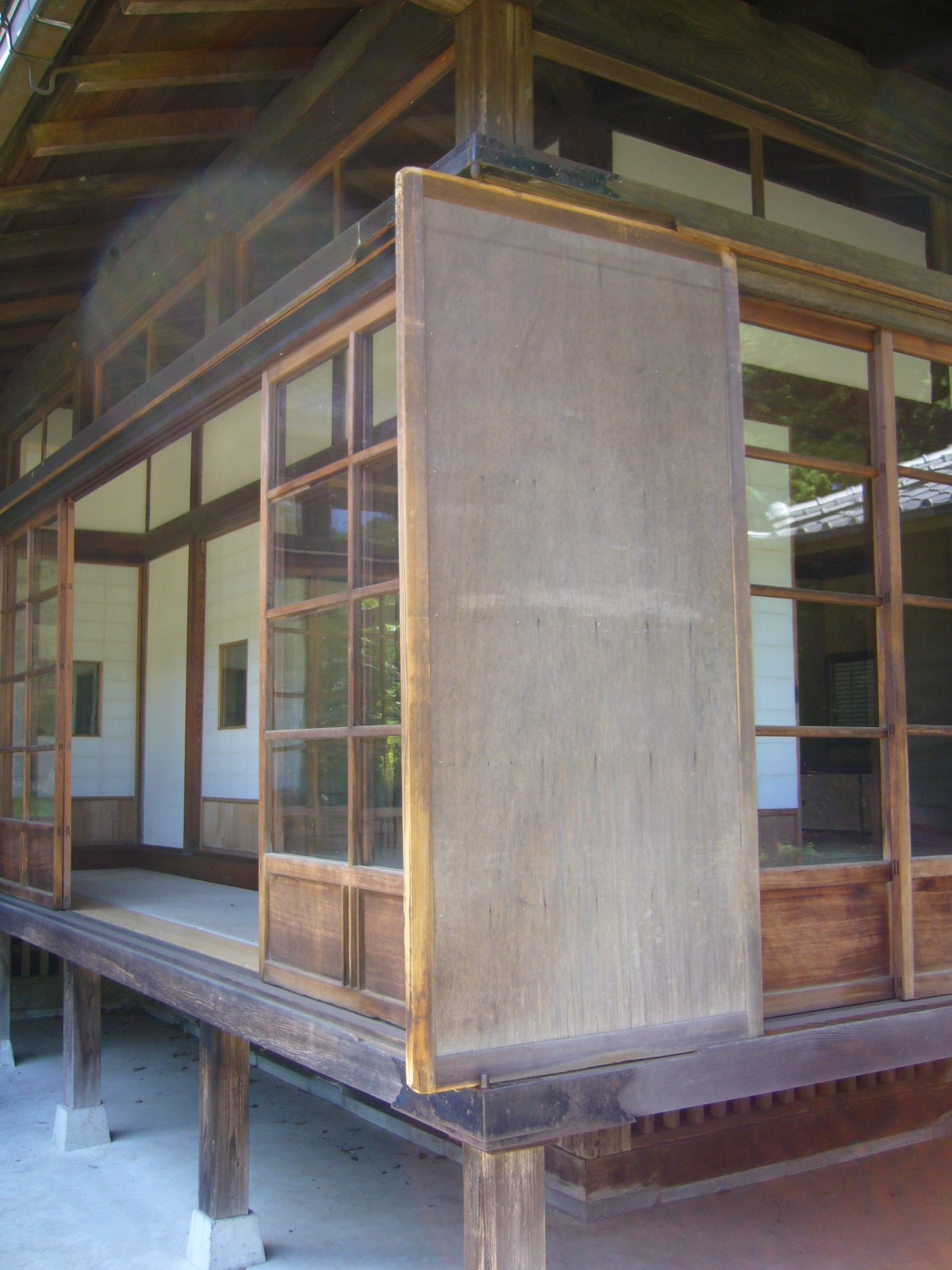
An example of Amado in Narita, Chiba, Japan

Amado (雨戸) is a fitting installed at an opening of a building for windproofing, crime prevention, light blocking, and blindfolding. It is used in Japanese houses, and is said to have been seen in architectural history since the late 16th century. Some European and American houses have steel shutters and double or triple glass doors that perform similar functions.

== History ==
Japanese houses have had fittings to protect them from the wind and rain since ancient times, such as ancient shitomi and medieval mairado. It was in the latter half of the 16th century that fittings named "Amato" began to appear in construction instructions, and the first one is said to be the Great Hall of Jurakudai, which was completed in 1587. Even in modern urban houses, storm shutters are installed when the opening faces the road or is easily accessible.

== Structure ==
The shutter is installed at the outermost part of the opening and can be moved using the sill and lintel, and can be pulled out from the door pocket when needed. There are two types of door bags: the door box type, which is covered with a panel, and the door plate type, where the main body of the shutter is exposed even when it is stored. Usually, the sill and lintel are a single groove (a sliding shutter), and they are used by being pulled out one by one from the door pocket.

Historically, there have also been doors that have two or more sliding grooves, those that have part of the door made of glass, and those that have shoji paper pasted on the top. A part called a monkey is used to lock the door, and there are ways to secure it with an ochilock (otoshizaru) or upper lock (agezaru) attached to the last piece of the shutter.

== See also ==
- Japanese architecture
