= Veranda =

Roofed, open-air hallway or porch

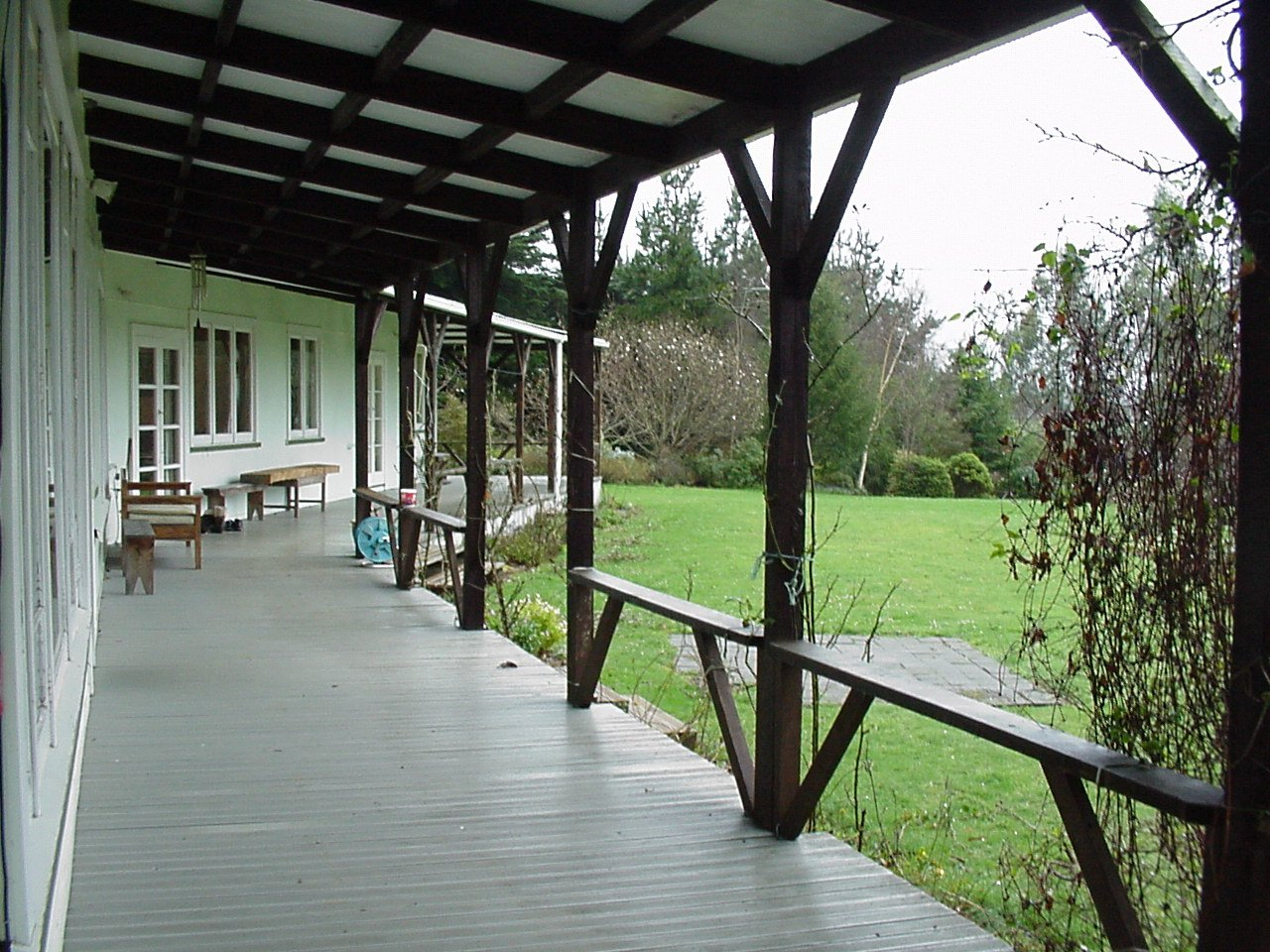
"Grande" style

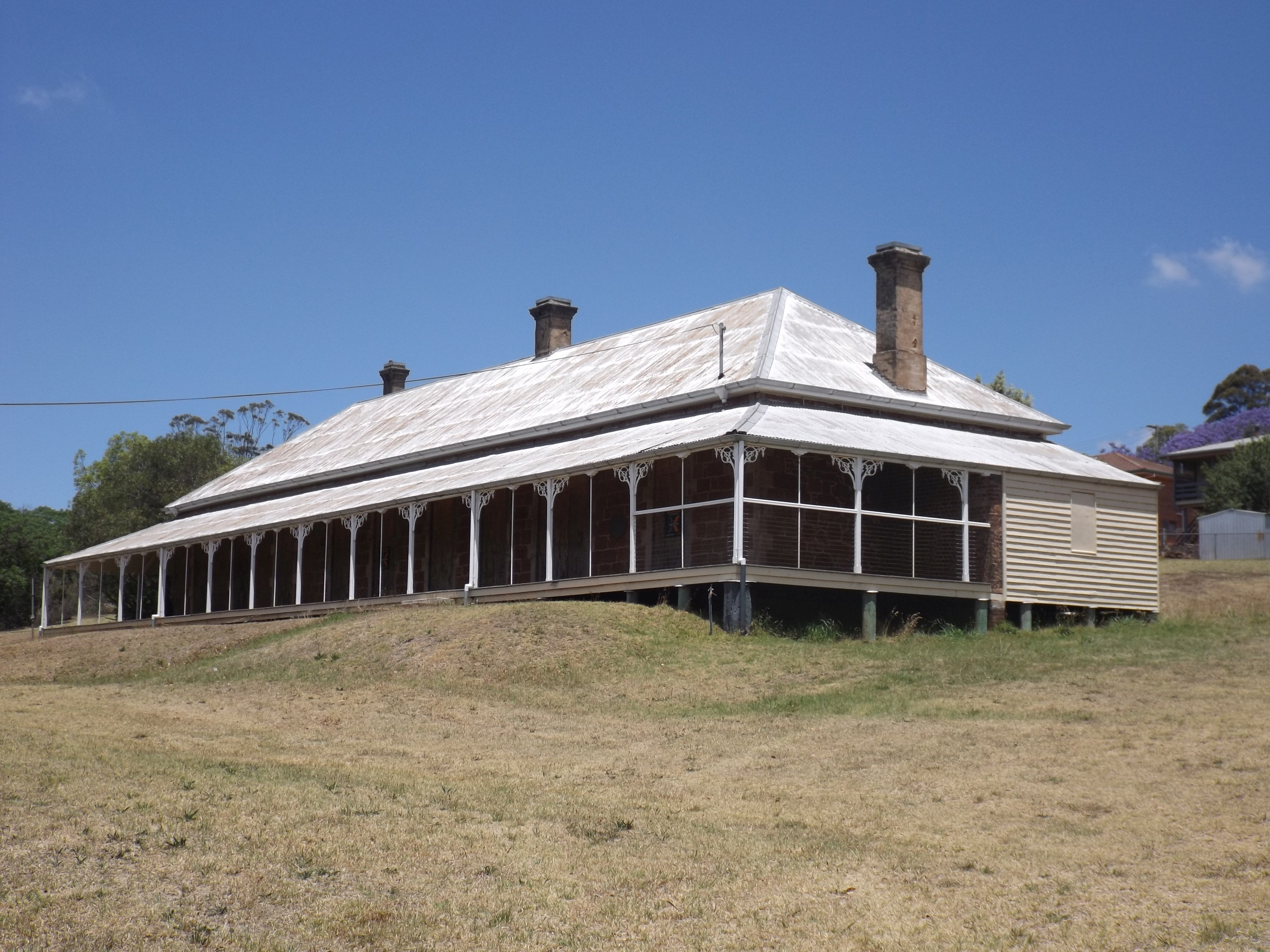
Harlaxton House, Toowoomba, Queensland, 2014

A veranda (also spelled verandah in Australian, New Zealand and Indian English) is a roofed, open-air hallway or porch, attached to the outside of a building. A veranda is often partly enclosed by a railing and frequently extends across the front and sides of the structure.

Authorities differ on the spelling of the word. The Concise Oxford English Dictionary gives the "h" version as a variant and The Guardian Style Guide says "veranda not verandah". Australia's Macquarie Dictionary prefers verandah.

== Etymology ==
Veranda, as used in the United Kingdom and France, was brought by the British from the Indian subcontinent (Bengali: বারান্দা, Hindi: बरामदा, Urdu: برآمدہ). It may have been originated from Persian Language برآمد which means "outwards", means an area which is outwards from the living/rooms and adopted into Urdu and Hindi from Persian. While the exact origin of the word is unknown, scholars suggest that the word may have originated in India or may have been adopted from the Portuguese and spread further to the British and French colonists. The Portuguese arrived on Malabar coast and adopted the Malayalam word "Varantha" (വരാന്ത) and English borrowed Varanda from Portuguese to Veranda. Ancient and medieval Indian texts on domestic architecture like Vastu shastra uses the word "Alinda" for this architectural feature.

== Architecture styles notable for verandas ==
=== Australia ===
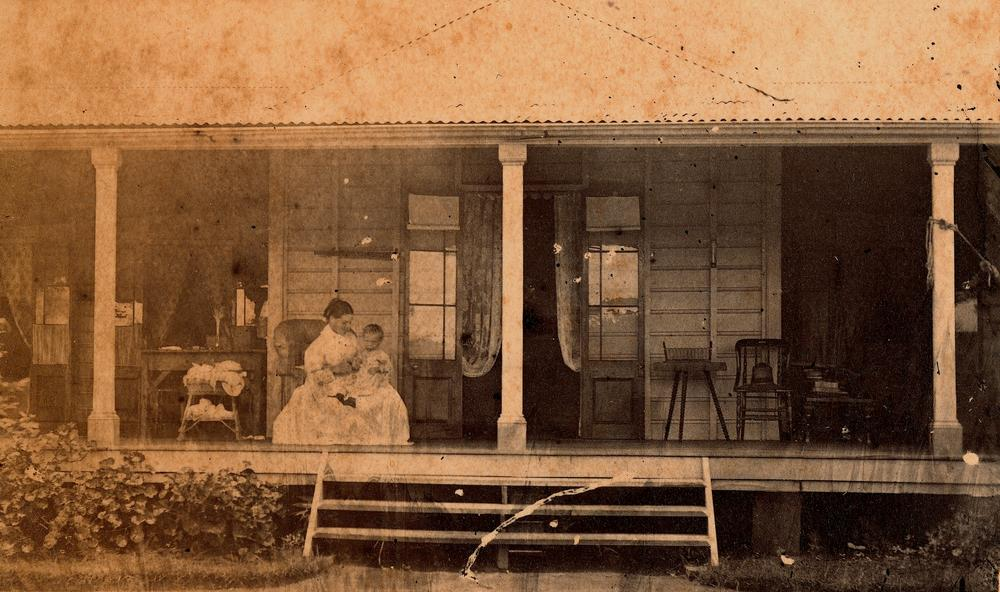
Winifred Rawson tending her son on the veranda of The Hollow, near Mackay, Queensland, ~1873

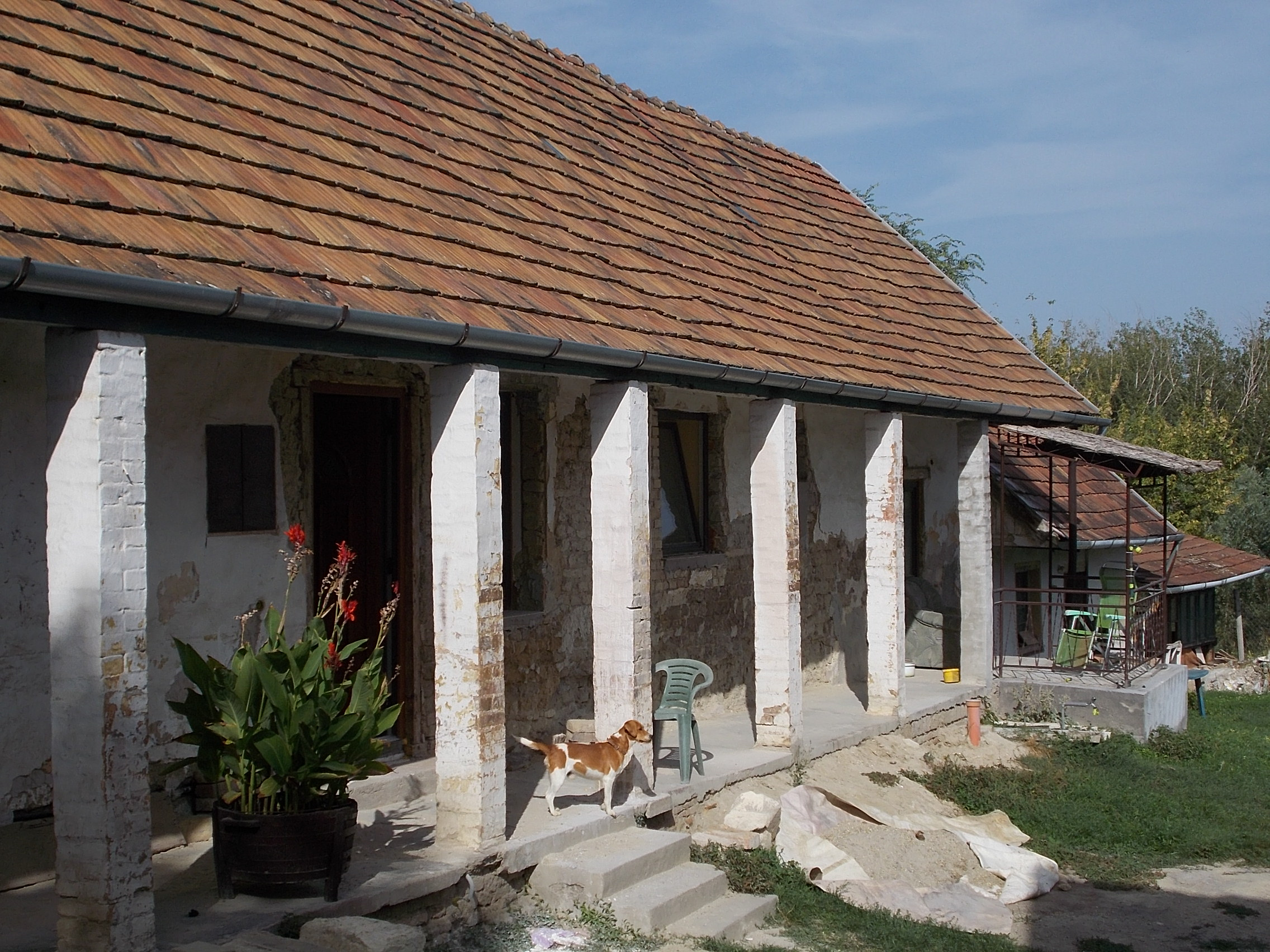
A heritage listed building in Hungary

The veranda has featured quite prominently in Australian vernacular architecture and first became widespread in colonial buildings during the 1850s. The Victorian Filigree architecture style is used by residential (particularly terraced houses in Australia and New Zealand) and commercial buildings (particularly hotels) across Australia and features decorative screens of wrought iron, cast iron "lace" or wood fretwork. The Queenslander is a style of residential construction in Queensland, Australia, which is adapted to subtropical climates and characterized in part by its large verandas, which sometimes encircle the entire house.

=== Brazil ===
The bandeirista style house from Brazil typically has a veranda positioned to face the sunrise.

=== Hong Kong ===
In Hong Kong, verandas often appear on the upper floor of the first to third generations of Tong Lau (shophouses) due to a lack of space since the 19th century.

=== India ===
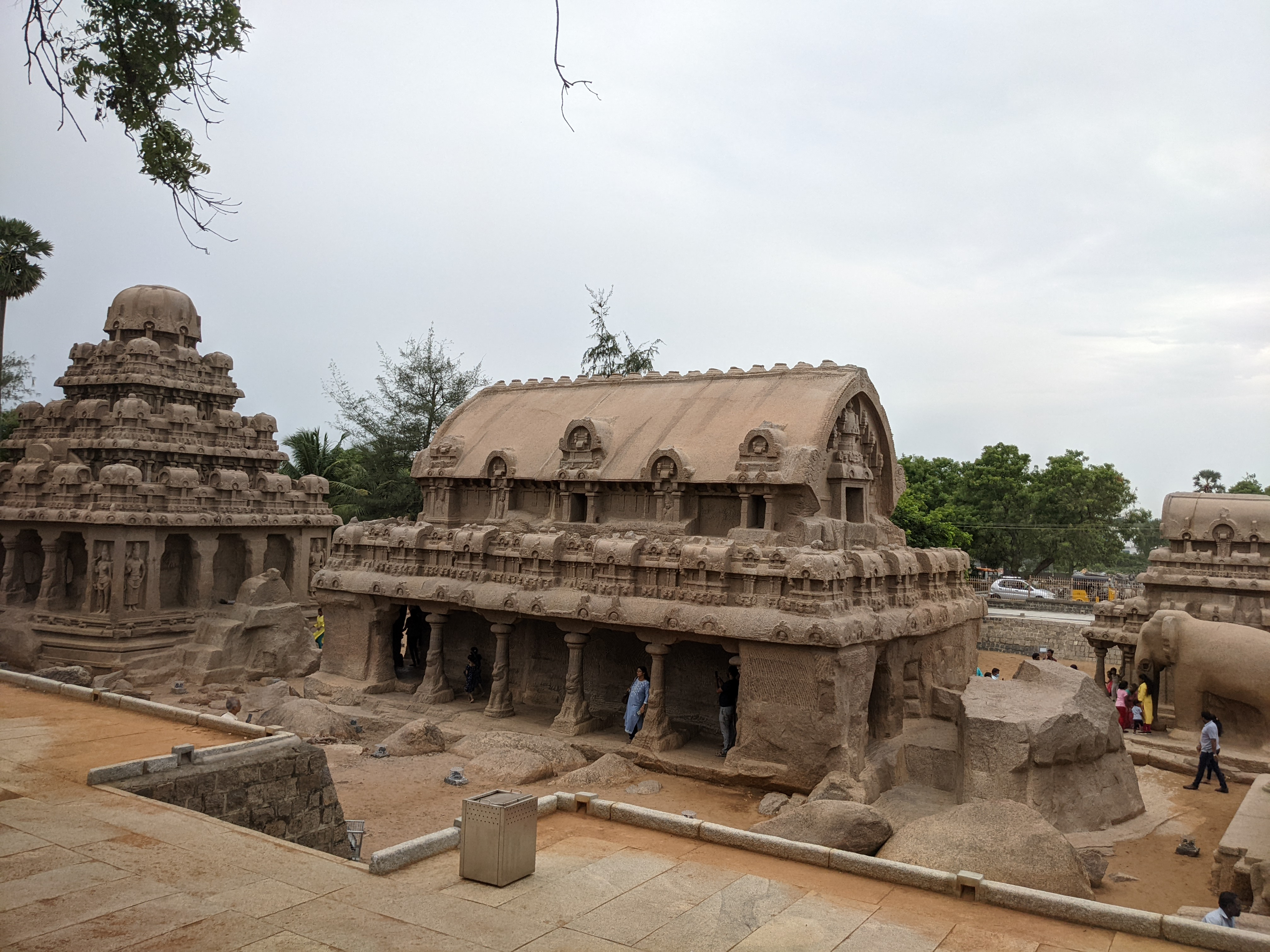
Bhima Ratha built in the form of a folk-house with verandah, 6th century AD.

Early known examples of verandah in domestic architecture come from Vastu shastra texts which lay out plans and describe methods to build houses, where alinda (veranda) is a common feature of domestic buildings.

Porches were a natural idea in India, a mostly warm, tropical country. In Gujarat the porch area is called the otala and in the Hindi belt it is known as alinda. These structures are not only used to cool off, but also as a centre of social life where neighbours can talk and kids play, or as a religious centre where rituals and worship of certain gods can take place.

In Southern India, the term thinnai is used, and these structures are very common. This area serves a religious purpose in addition to a social one, and is the centre of everyday life for many. Konkan's architecture is influenced by nature. It is sustainable and cost-effective. In Konkan traditional architecture, the veranda is called otti, a semi-open space with low seating covered with a permanent roof. It serves as a transition space leading to an enclosed environment. Sometimes the sides are covered by wooden jali walls. It offers a temporary resting space to house members during the afternoon and evening.

=== Japan ===
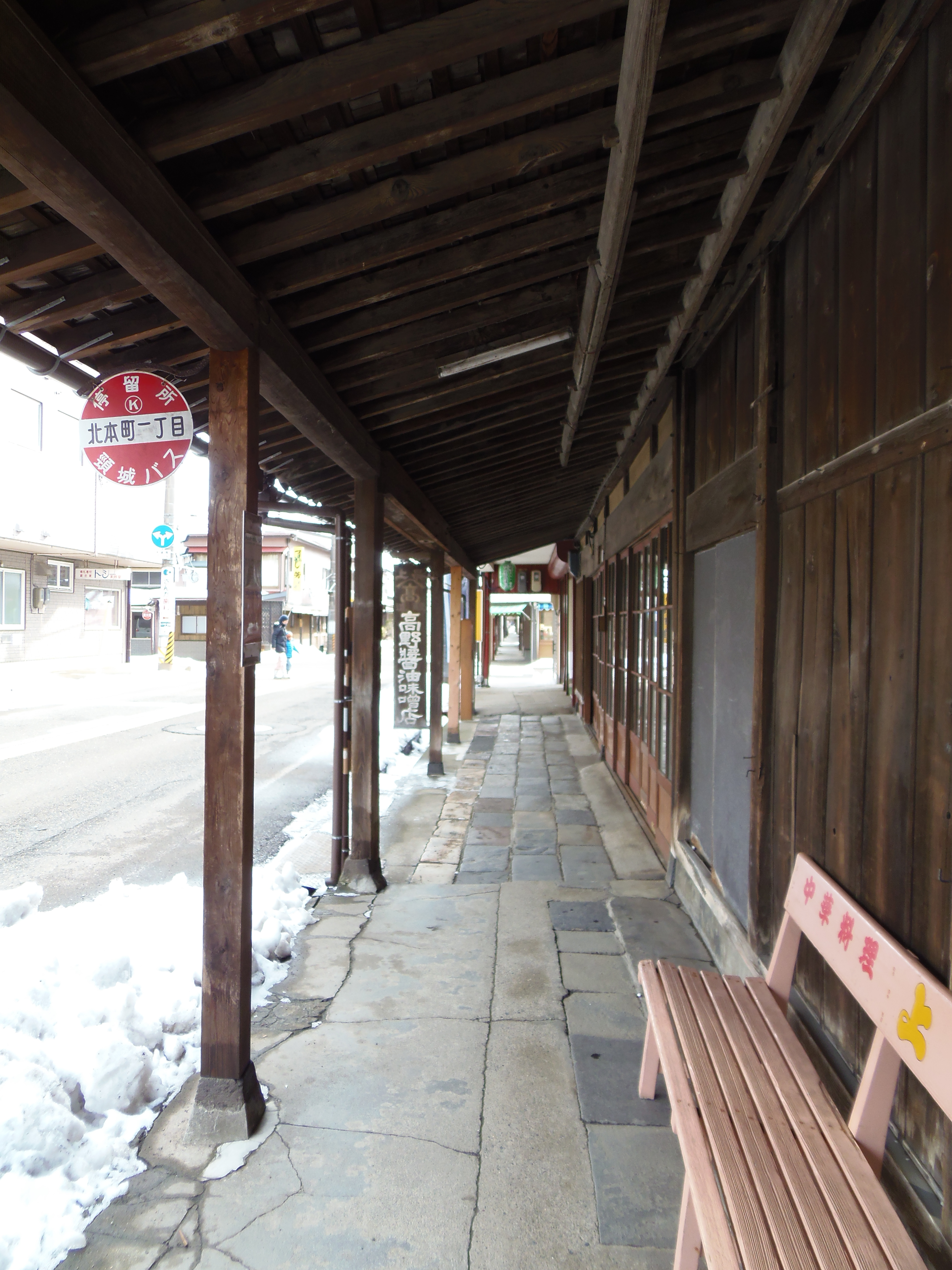
Gangi-Zukuri in Takada area of Jōetsu City

In regions with heavy snowfall, especially Aomori and Niigata prefectures, structures called Gangi-Zukuri (ja:雁木造) have been developed since the Edo period. For example, the total length of Gangi in old Takada city is over 16 Kilometers.

=== Poland ===
In Poland, the word "weranda" is commonly used for the unheated roofed annex to a house, without walls or with glass walls.

=== Sri Lanka ===
In Sri Lanka, verandas' original derivation was from traditional vernacular architecture and are known as "Pila" in Sinhalese. Both front and rear veranda examples are also known and common feature in local vernacular architecture. Traditionally, domestic vernacular architecture layouts were also influenced by Sri Lankan Buddhist Manjusri Vasthu Vidya Sastra text, which in turn was influenced by Indian Vastu Shastra texts.

=== United States ===
The Creole townhouse in New Orleans, Louisiana, is also noted for its prominent use of verandas. In fact, most houses constructed in the Southern United States before the advent of air conditioning were built with a covered front porch or veranda.

Spanish Colonial architecture (as well as the "Mission style" revivalist version that became popular in the Western United States in the early 1900s) commonly incorporates verandas, both on the exterior of buildings and, in cases of buildings with courtyards, along the interior walls of courtyards. In some cases, homes were constructed with every room opening into a courtyard veranda, rather than interior corridors or direct connections to other rooms.

== See also ==
- Awning
- Baldresca
- Canopy
- Deck
- Engawa
- Gallery (disambiguation)
- Lanai (architecture)
- Loggia
- Overhang (architecture)
- Patio
- Porch sitting
- Portico
- Shophouse
- Terrace
