= Loggia =

Covered exterior gallery, one side open

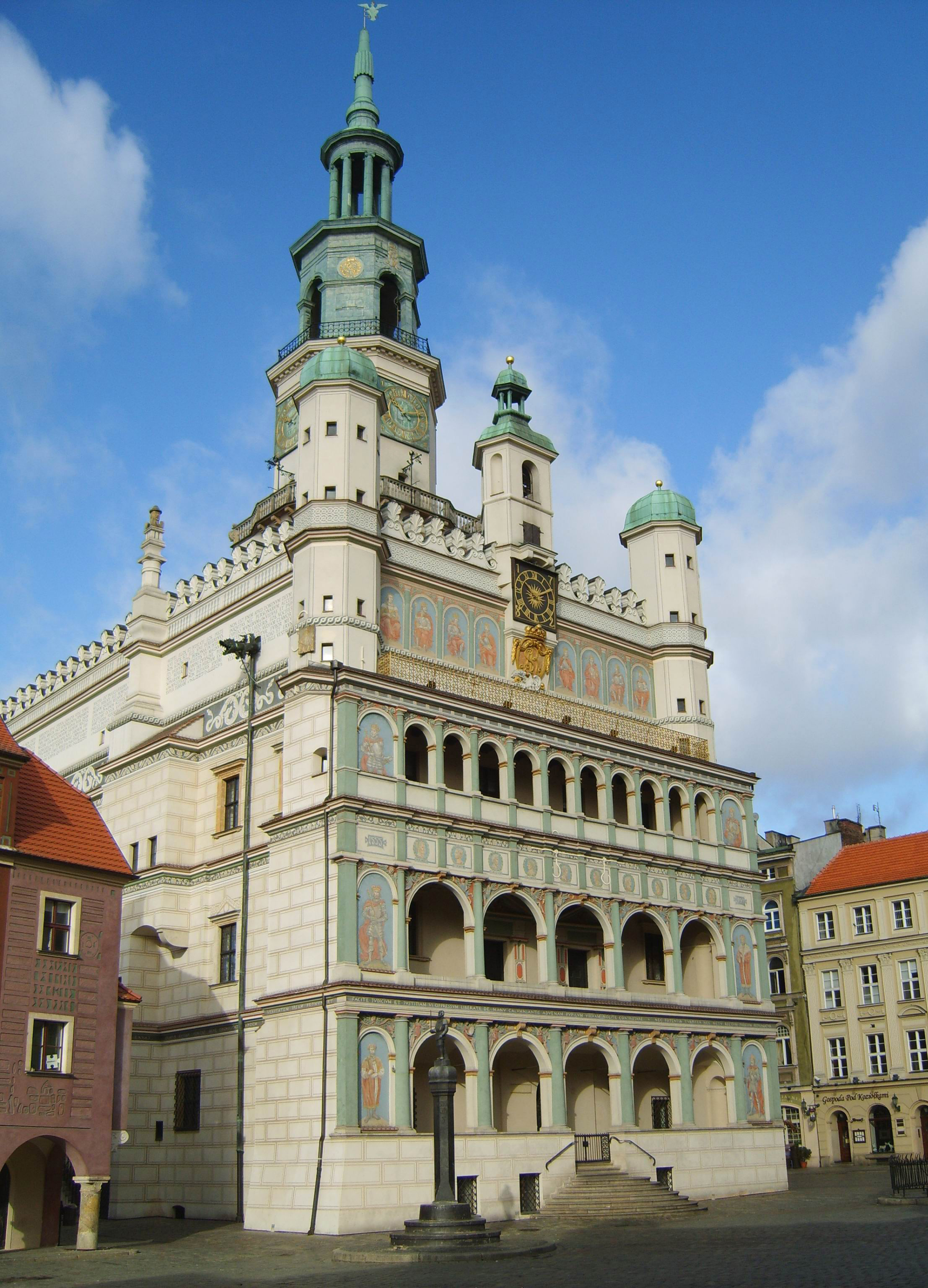
The Renaissance three-story arcade loggia of the City Hall in Poznań, Poland, served representative and communication purposes.

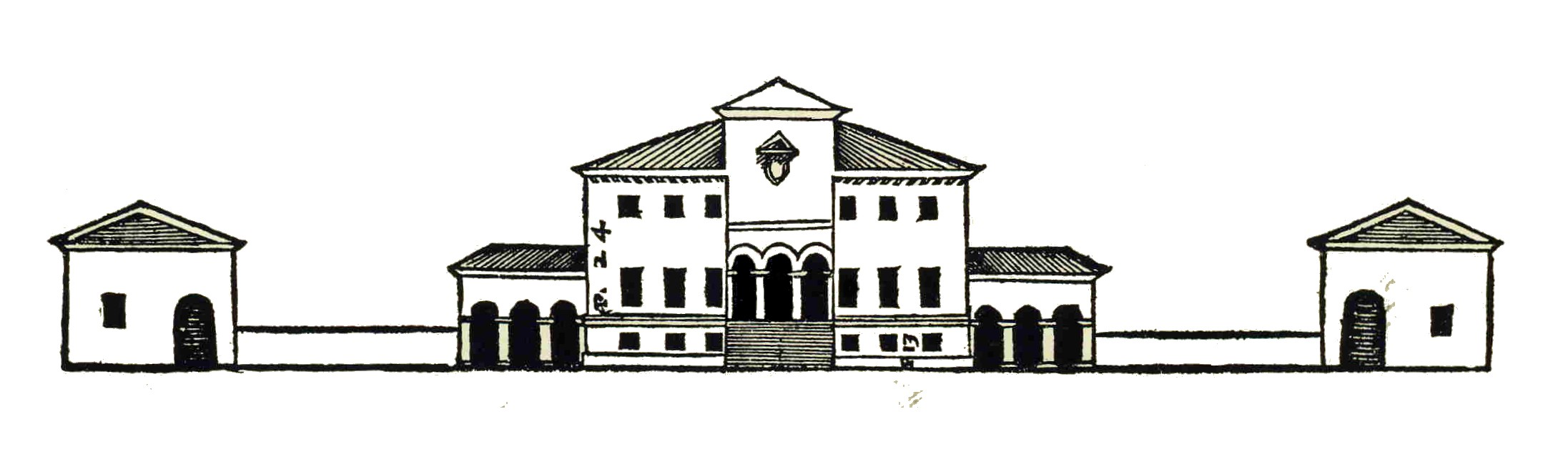
Villa Godi by Palladio. The portico is the focal point in the center with loggias used at each side of the structure as a corridor.

In architecture, a loggia (/ˈloʊdʒ(i)ə/, usually UK: /ˈlɒdʒ(i)ə/, Italian: [ˈlɔddʒa]) is a covered exterior gallery or corridor, often on an upper level, sometimes on the ground level of a building. The corridor is open to the elements because its outer wall is only partial, with the upper part usually supported by a series of columns or arches. An overhanging loggia may be supported by a baldresca.

From the early Middle Ages, nearly every Italian comune had an open arched loggia in its main square, which served as a "symbol of communal justice and government and as a stage for civic ceremony".

In Italian architecture, a loggia is also a small garden structure or house built on the roof of a residence, open on one or more sides, to enjoy cooling winds and the view. They were especially popular in the 17th century and are prominent in Rome and Bologna, Italy.

== Definition of the Roman loggia ==
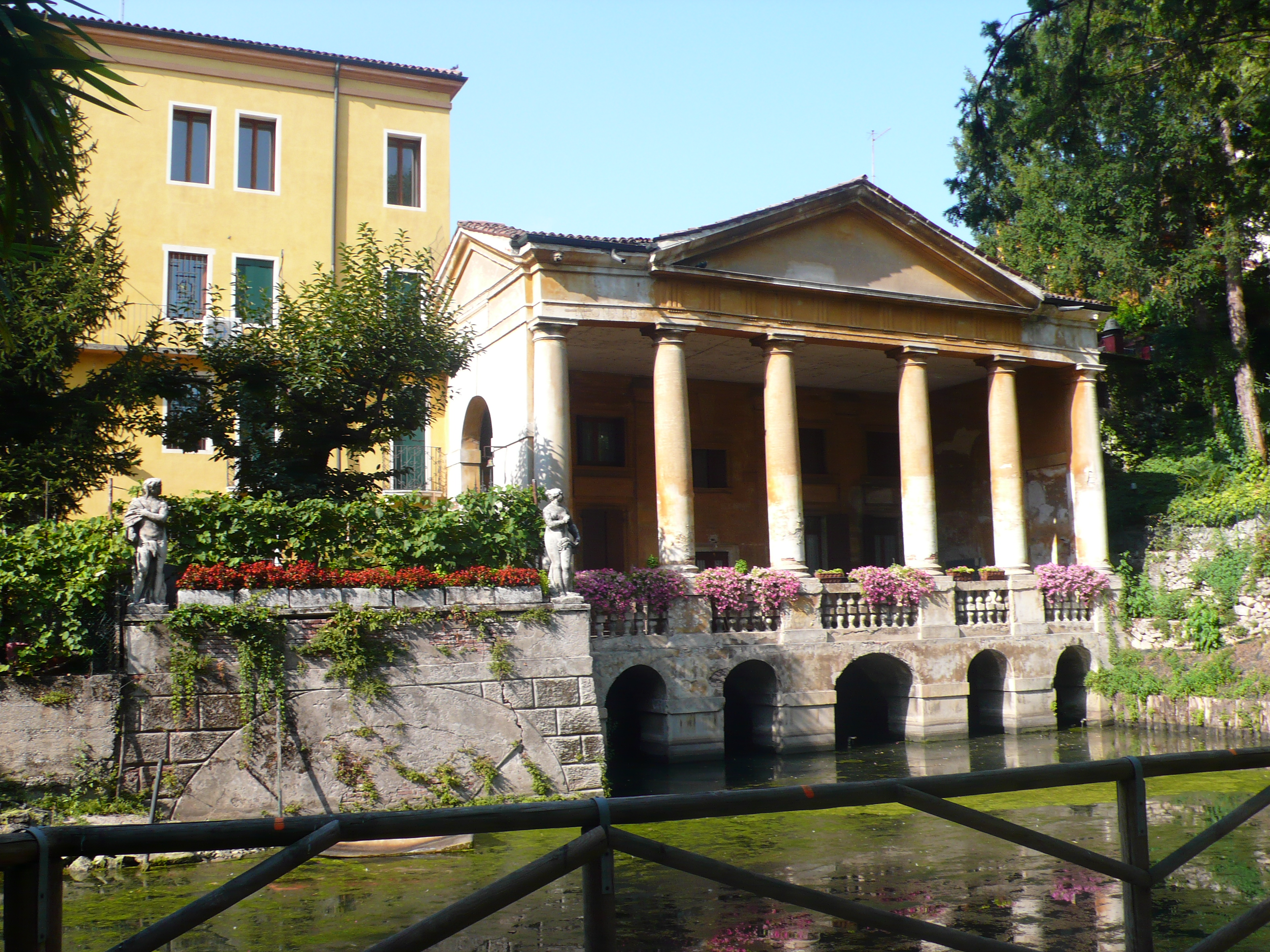
Loggia Valmarana in Vicenza, Italy, by Palladio, UNESCO

The main difference between a loggia and a portico is the role within the functional layout of the building. The portico allows entrance to the inside from the exterior and can be found on vernacular and small scale buildings. Thus, it is found mainly on noble residences and public buildings. A classic use of both is that represented in the mosaics of Basilica of Sant'Apollinare Nuovo of the Royal Palace.

Loggias differ from verandas in that a loggia is a covered exterior gallery that is part of a building, typically open on one or more sides and supported by columns or arches, often overlooking a courtyard or garden. An arcade, by contrast, is a series of arches supported by columns or piers, forming a covered walkway or decorative façade element. While both use arches and columns, a loggia serves as a semi-outdoor room for leisure, whereas an arcade provides shelter and rhythm along a passage or street.

Loggias differ from arcades in that they are more architectural and, in form, are part of the main edifice in which they are located, while verandas are roofed structures attached on the outside of the main building. A "double loggia" occurs when a loggia is located on an upper floor level above a loggia on the floor beneath.

== Examples ==
- Grinnell College in Grinnell, Iowa, contains three distinct sets of dorms connected by loggias. The main quad on the Stanford University campus in Stanford, California, prominently features loggias, as do the University Center and Purnell Center for the Arts at Carnegie Mellon University, which frame a quad known as the Cut.
- In the city centre of Chester in England, a number of timber-framed buildings dating from the medieval to Victorian periods have first-floor loggias called the Chester Rows.
- In Russia and Switzerland, a loggia can be a form of recessed balcony on a residential apartment building.
- A loggia was added to the Sydney Opera House in 2006.
- At the archeological site of Hagia Triada on the Greek island of Crete, several loggias constructed around 1400 BC have been located and whose column bases still remain.
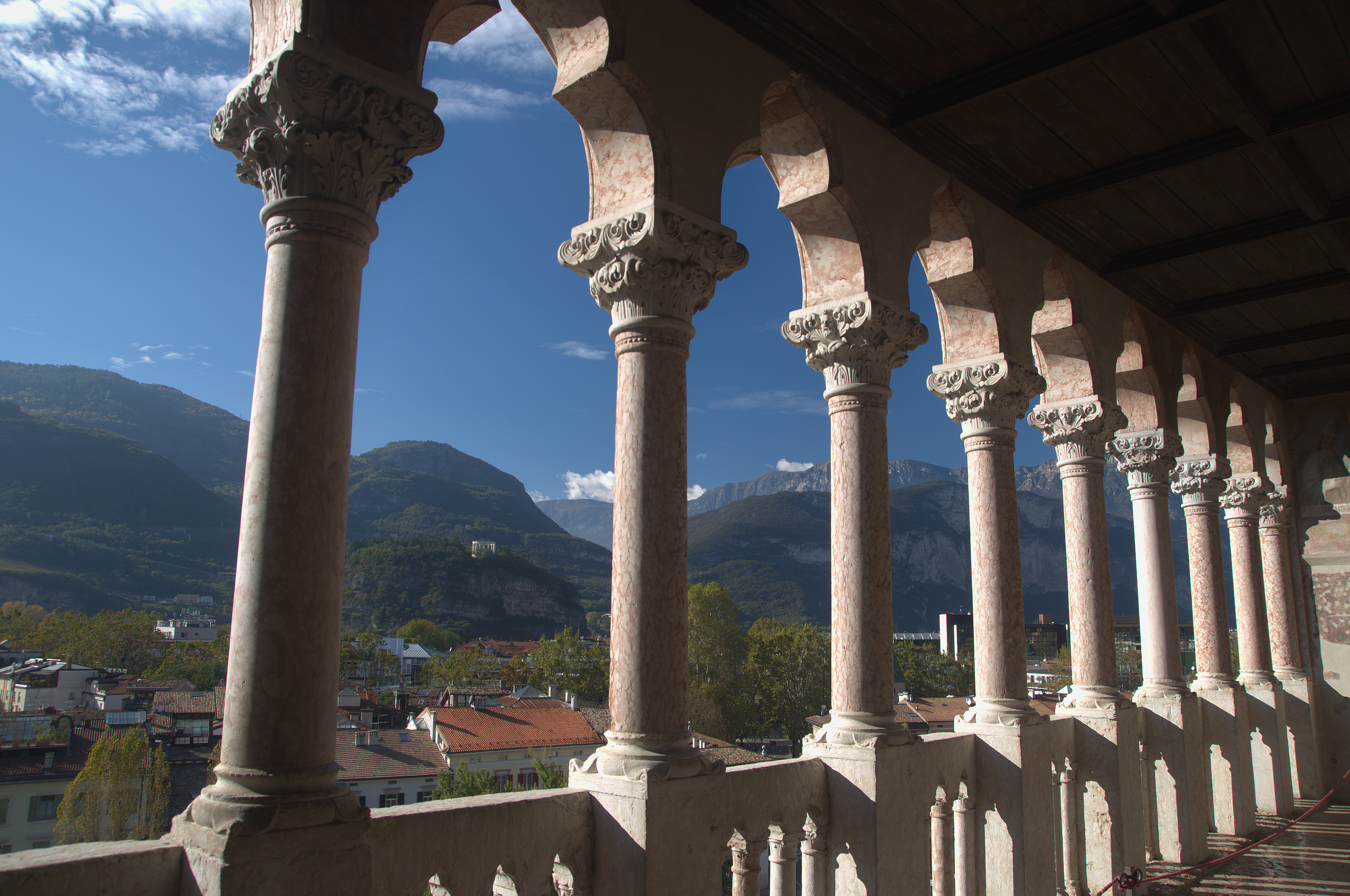
The Venetian Gothic loggia of the Buonconsiglio Castle in Trento, Italy

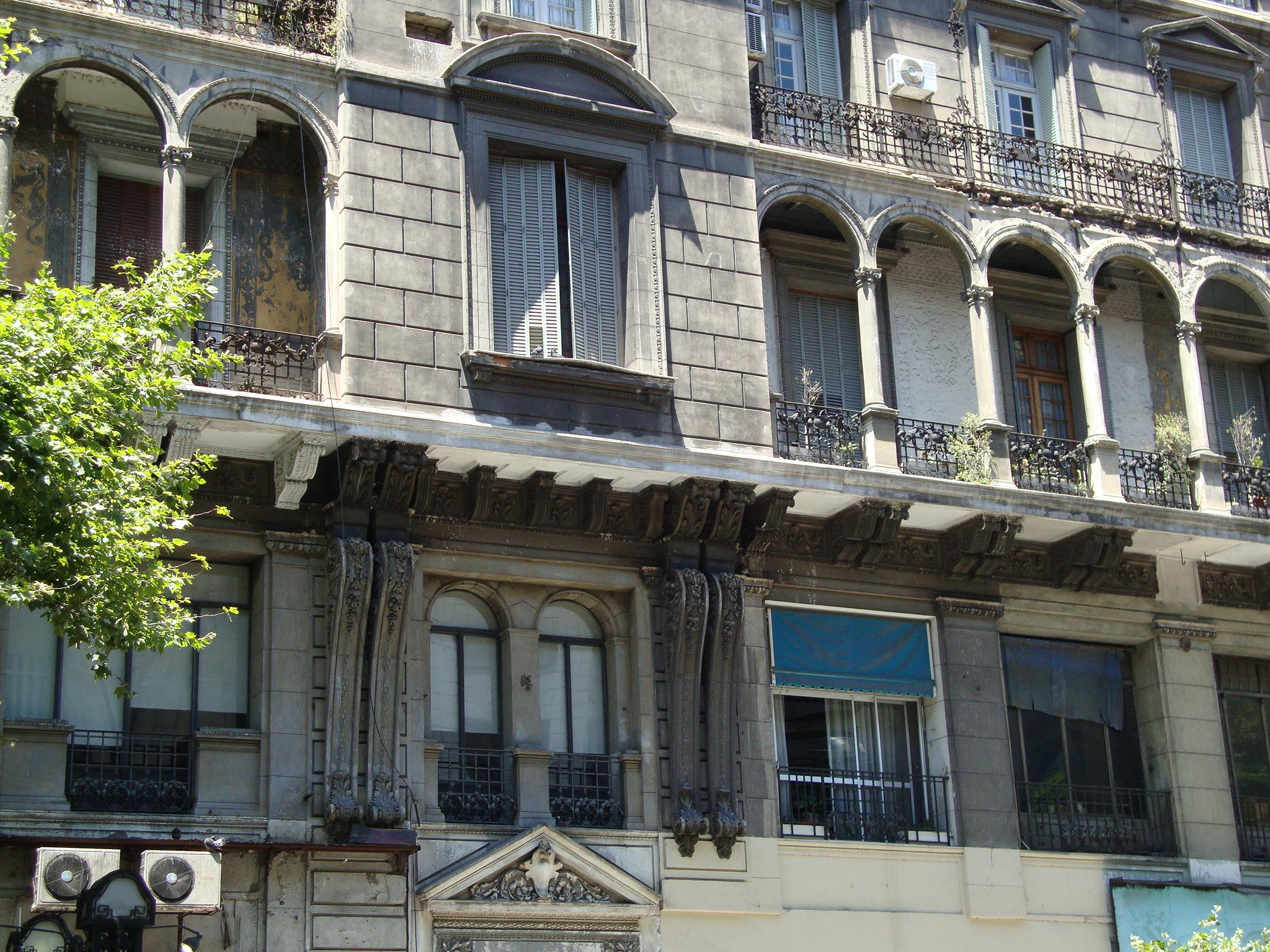
The loggia of the Edificio La Inmobiliaria in Buenos Aires, Argentina

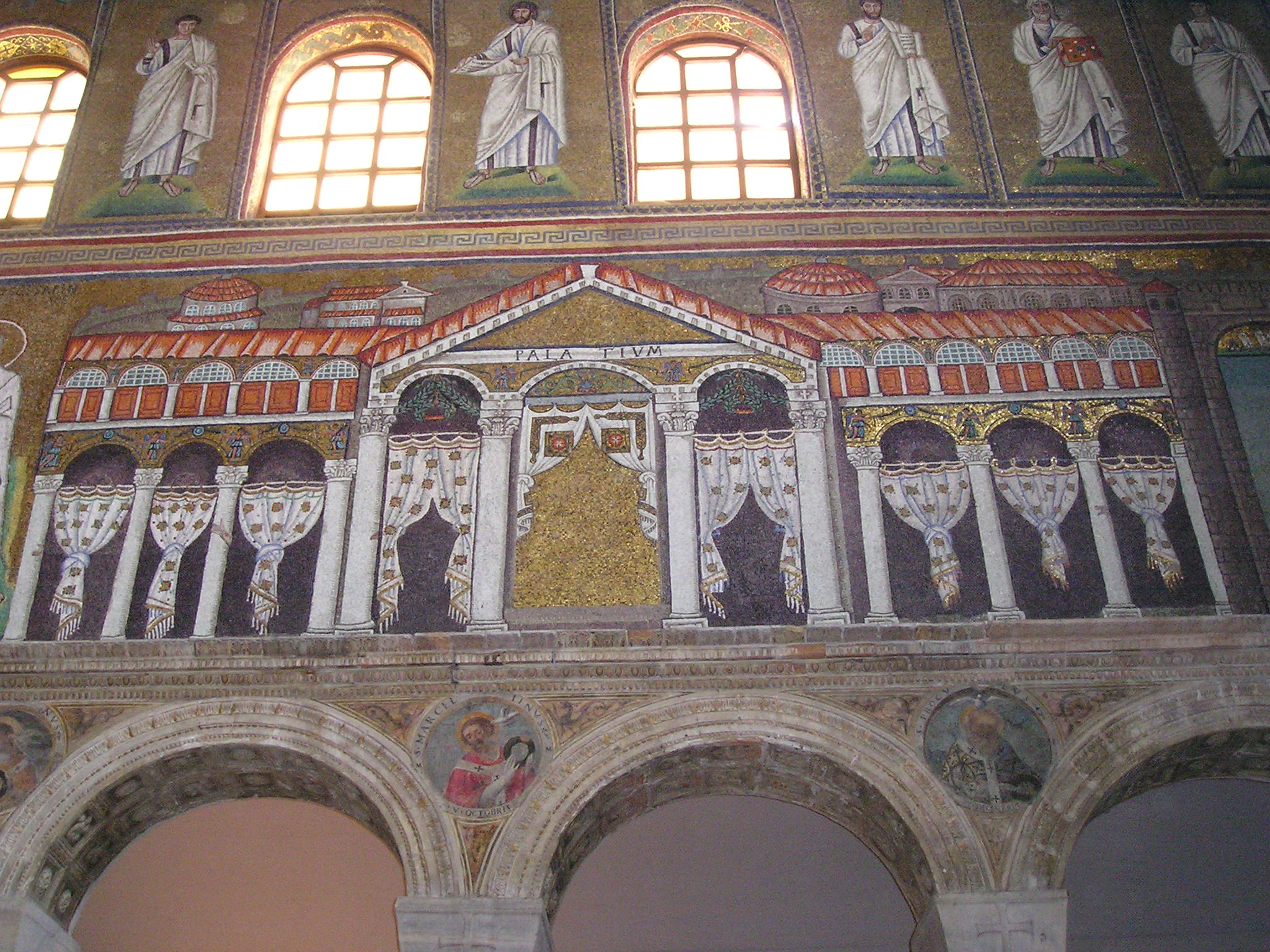
A mosaic found in the nave of the 6th-century Basilica of Sant'Apollinare Nuovo in Ravenna, Italy, depicts a loggia.

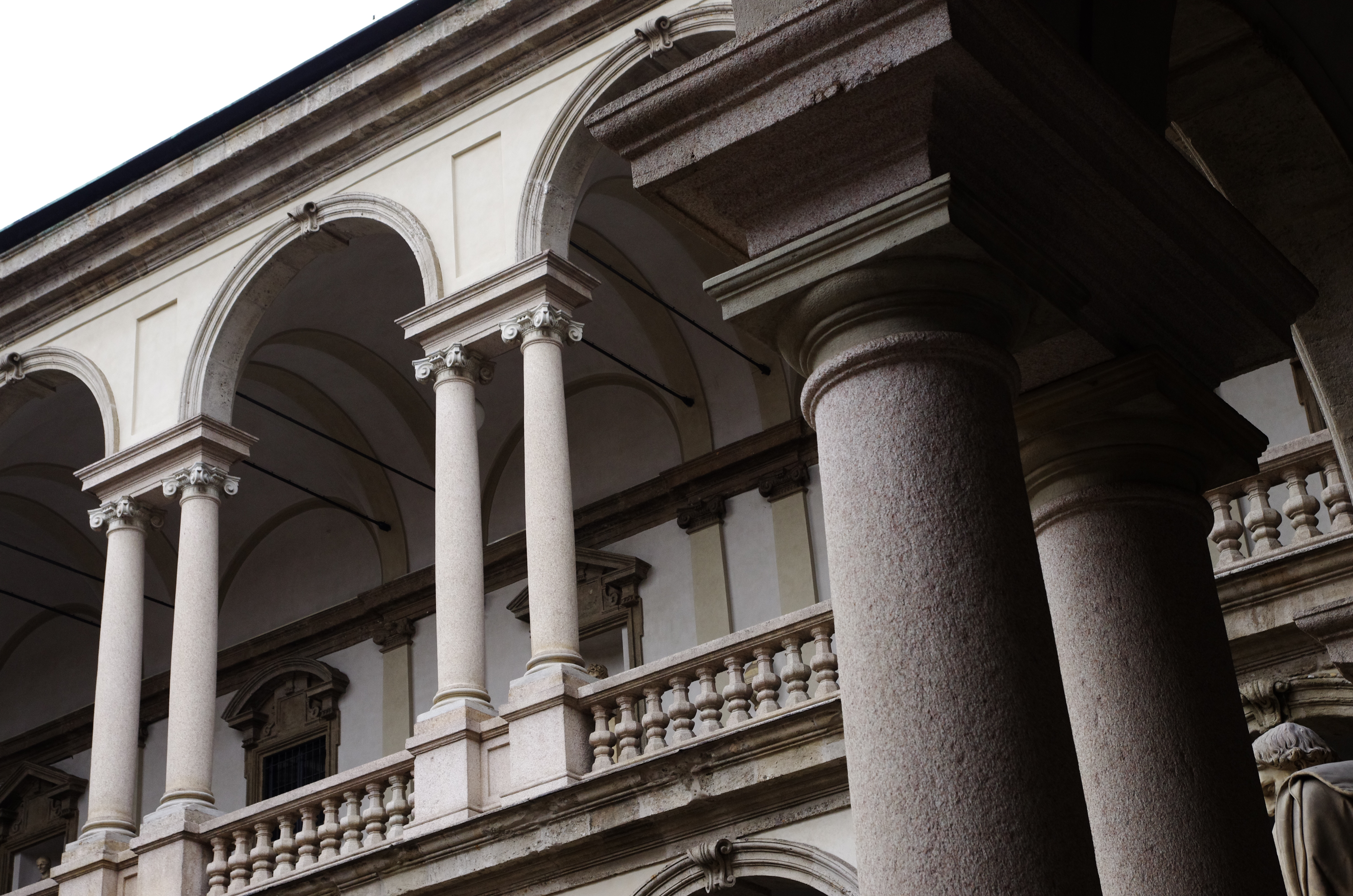
Loggia in the shape of a Venetian window, at the Palazzo Brera in Milan, Italy

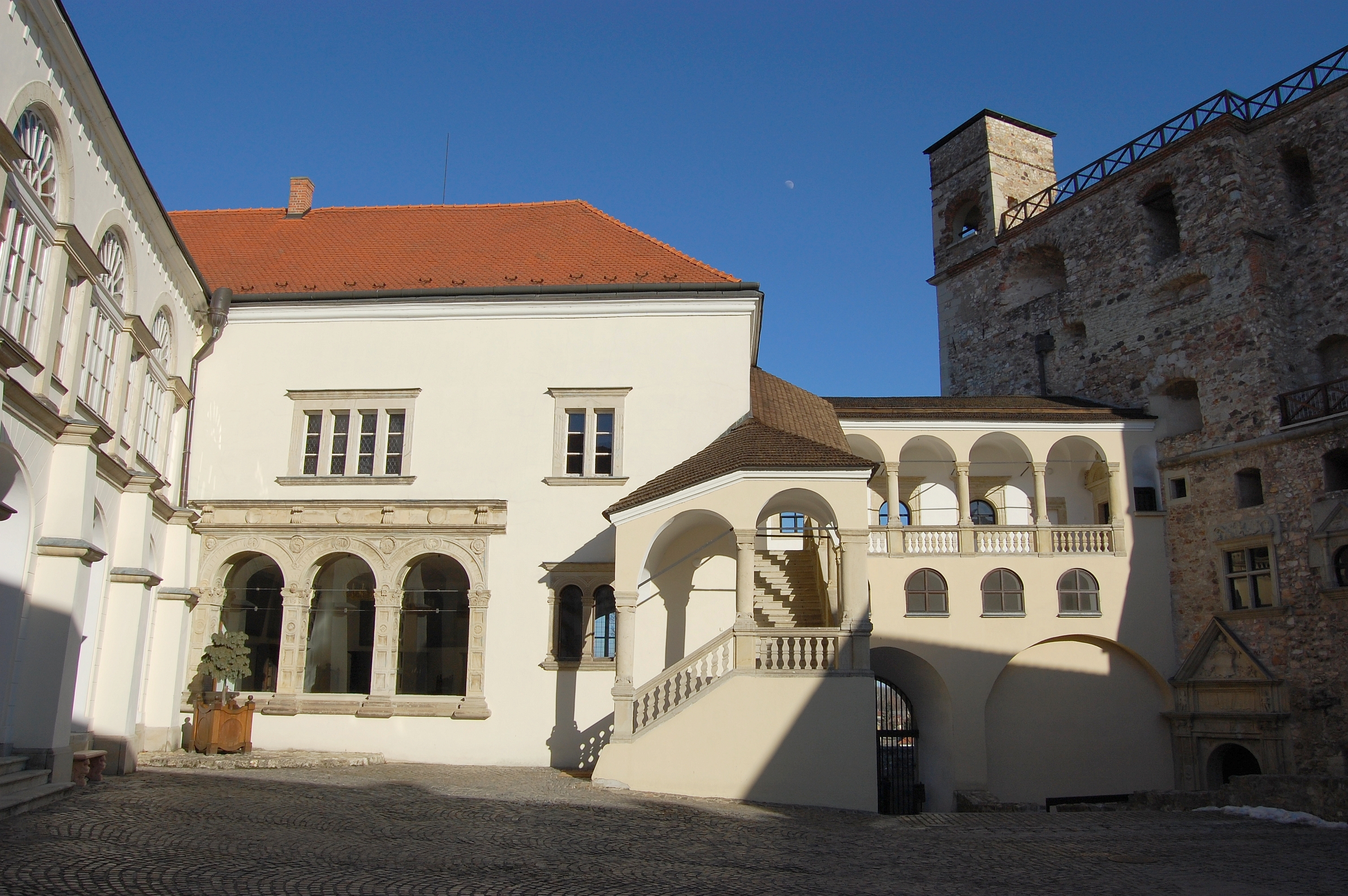
The 17th-century Renaissance Lorántffy loggia in the Castle of Sárospatak, Borsod-Abaúj-Zemplén County, Hungary

== See also ==
- Baldresca
- Five-foot way
- Madonna della Loggia (Botticelli)
- Pedway
- Peristyle
- Portico
- Skyway
- Veranda

== Bibliography ==
- Curl, James Stevens (2006). A Dictionary of Architecture and Landscape Architecture (paperback) (Second ed.). Oxford University Press. p. 880. ISBN 0-19-860678-8.
