= Peristyle =

Porch surrounding an inner courtyard

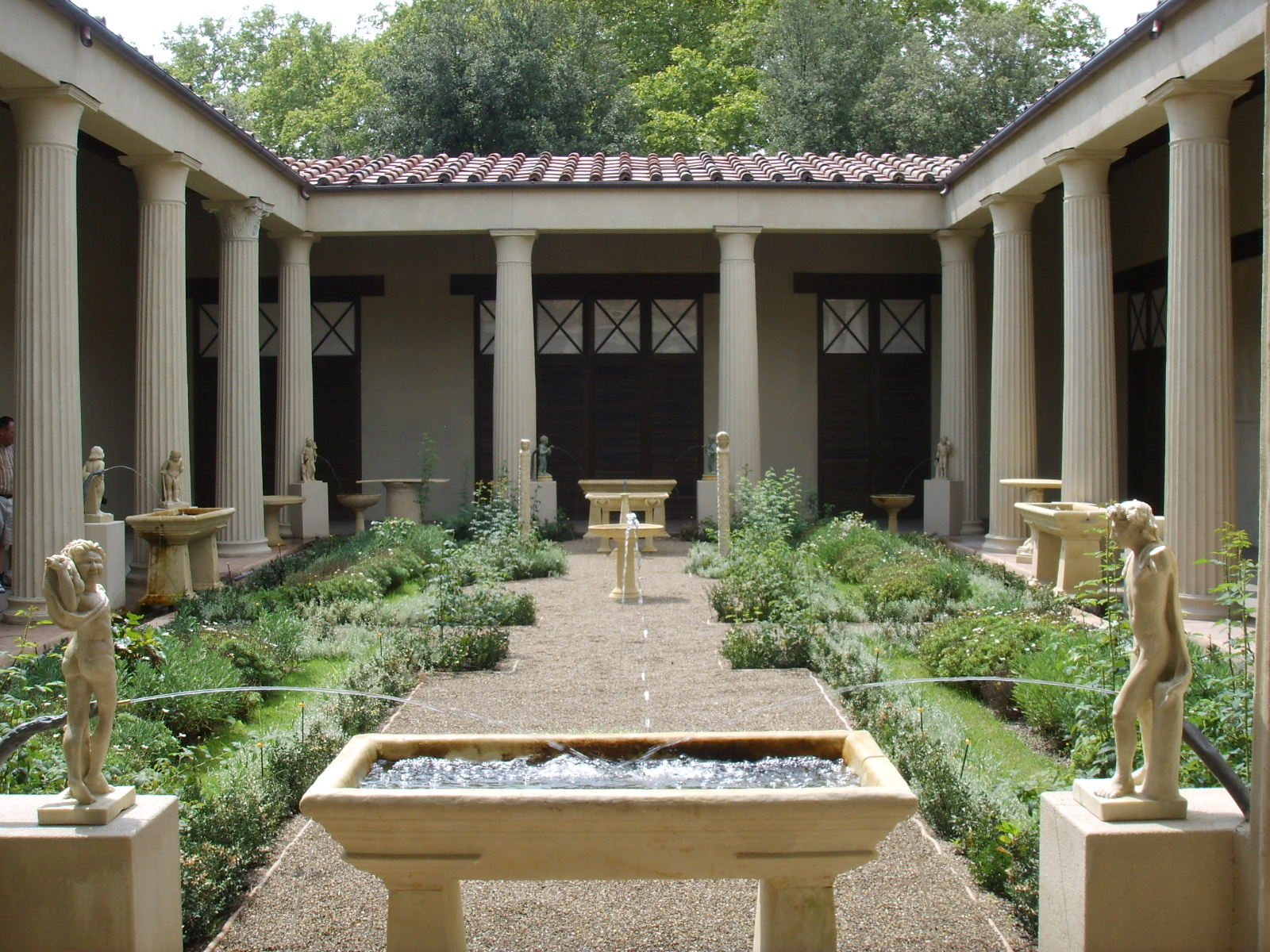
Reconstruction of a Roman peristyle surrounding a courtyard in Pompeii, Italy

In ancient Greek and Roman architecture, a peristyle (/ˈpɛrɪˌstaɪl/; Ancient Greek: περίστυλον, romanized: perístulon) is a continuous porch formed by a row of columns (a colonnade) surrounding the perimeter of a building or a courtyard. Tetrastoön (τετράστῳον/τετράστοον, tetrástōion/tetrástoon, 'four arcades') is a rarely used archaic term for this feature. The peristyle in a Greek temple is a peristasis (περίστασις, perístasis). In the Christian ecclesiastical architecture that developed from the Roman basilica, a courtyard peristyle and its garden came to be known as a cloister.

== Etymology ==
The Greek word περίστυλον perístylon is composed of περί peri, "around" or "surrounded", and στῦλος stylos, "column" or "pillar", together meaning "surrounded by columns/pillars". It was Latinised into synonyms peristylum and peristylium.

== In Roman architecture ==
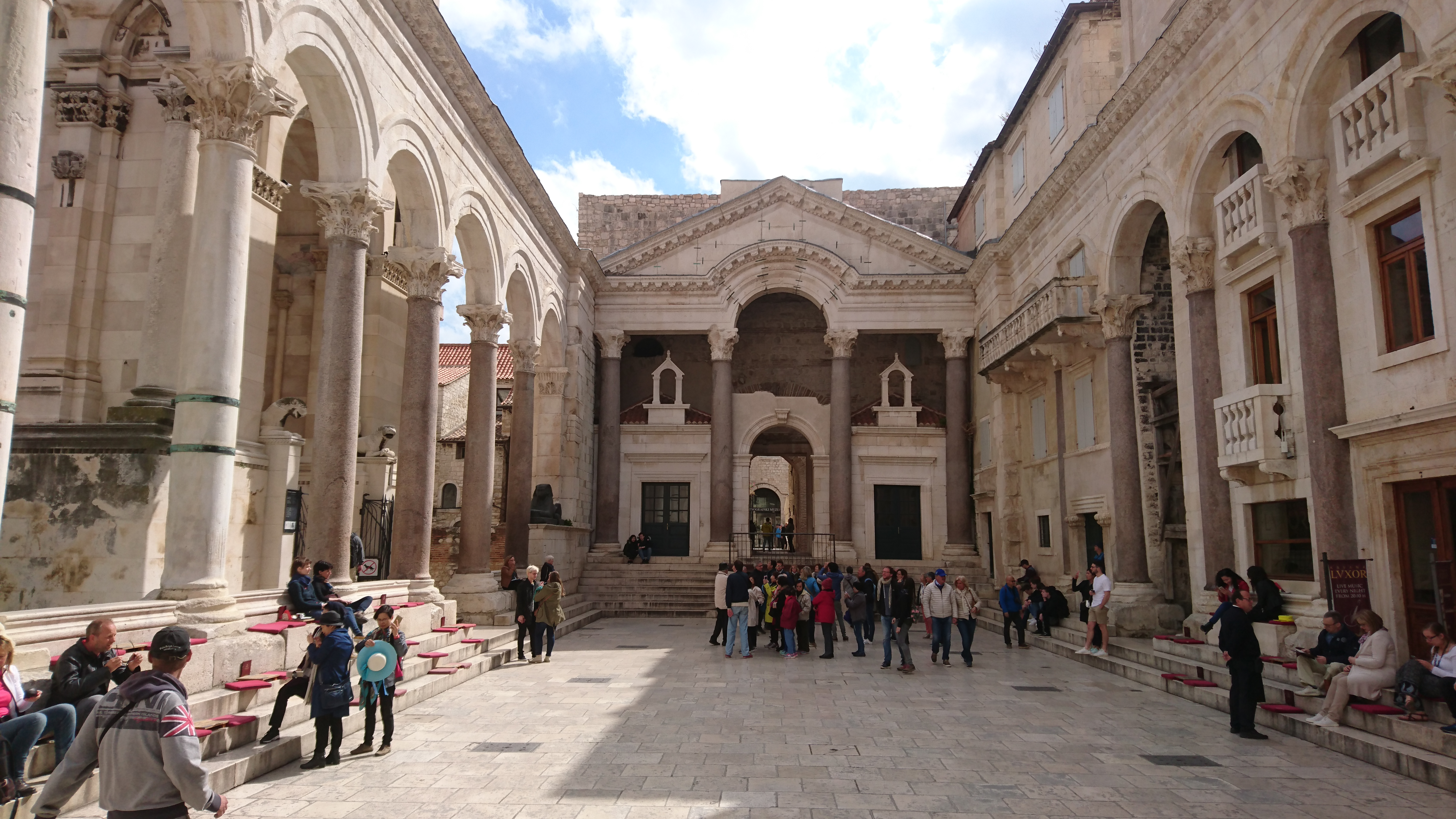
Peristyle in Diocletian's Palace

In rural settings, a wealthy Roman could surround a villa with terraced gardens but often included a peristyle with the design; in a domus in the city, Romans often used peristyle to create a garden or open space within the house. The columns or square pillars surrounding the garden supported a shady roofed portico whose inner walls were often embellished with elaborate wall paintings of landscapes and trompe-l'œil architecture. Sometimes the lararium, a shrine for the Lares, the gods of the household, was located in this portico, or it might be found in the atrium.

The courtyard might contain flowers and shrubs, fountains, benches, sculptures and even fish ponds. Romans devoted as large a space to the peristyle as site constraints permitted. In the grandest development of the urban peristyle house, as it evolved in Roman North Africa, often one part of the portico was eliminated for a larger open space.

The end of the Roman domus is one mark of the extinction of late antiquity. Simon P. Ellis wrote in the American Journal of Archaeology that it represented "the disappearance of the Roman peristyle house marks the end of the ancient world and its way of life." "No new peristyle houses were built after A.D. 550." Noting that as houses and villas were increasingly abandoned in the fifth century, a few palatial structures were expanded and enriched, as power and classical culture became concentrated in a narrowing class, and public life withdrew to the basilica, or audience chamber, of the magnate.

In the Eastern Roman empire, late antiquity lingered longer: Ellis identified the latest-known peristyle house built from scratch as the Villa of the Falconer at Argos, Peloponnese, dating from the style of its floor mosaics to about 530–550. Existing houses in many cases were subdivided to accommodate a larger and less elite population in a warren of small spaces, and columned porticoes were enclosed in small cubicles, as at the House of Hesychius at Cyrene.

== Other uses ==
Although ancient Egyptian architecture predates Greek and Roman architecture, historians frequently use the Greek term peristyle to describe similar, earlier structures in ancient Egyptian palace architecture and in Levantine houses known as liwan houses.

== See also ==
- Arcade
- Baldresca
- Cyclostyle (monopteros): a ring of columns
- Hypostyle
- Loggia
- Quadrangle (architecture)
- Peristyle (Prospect Park)
