= Baldresca =

Architectural element supporting loggia

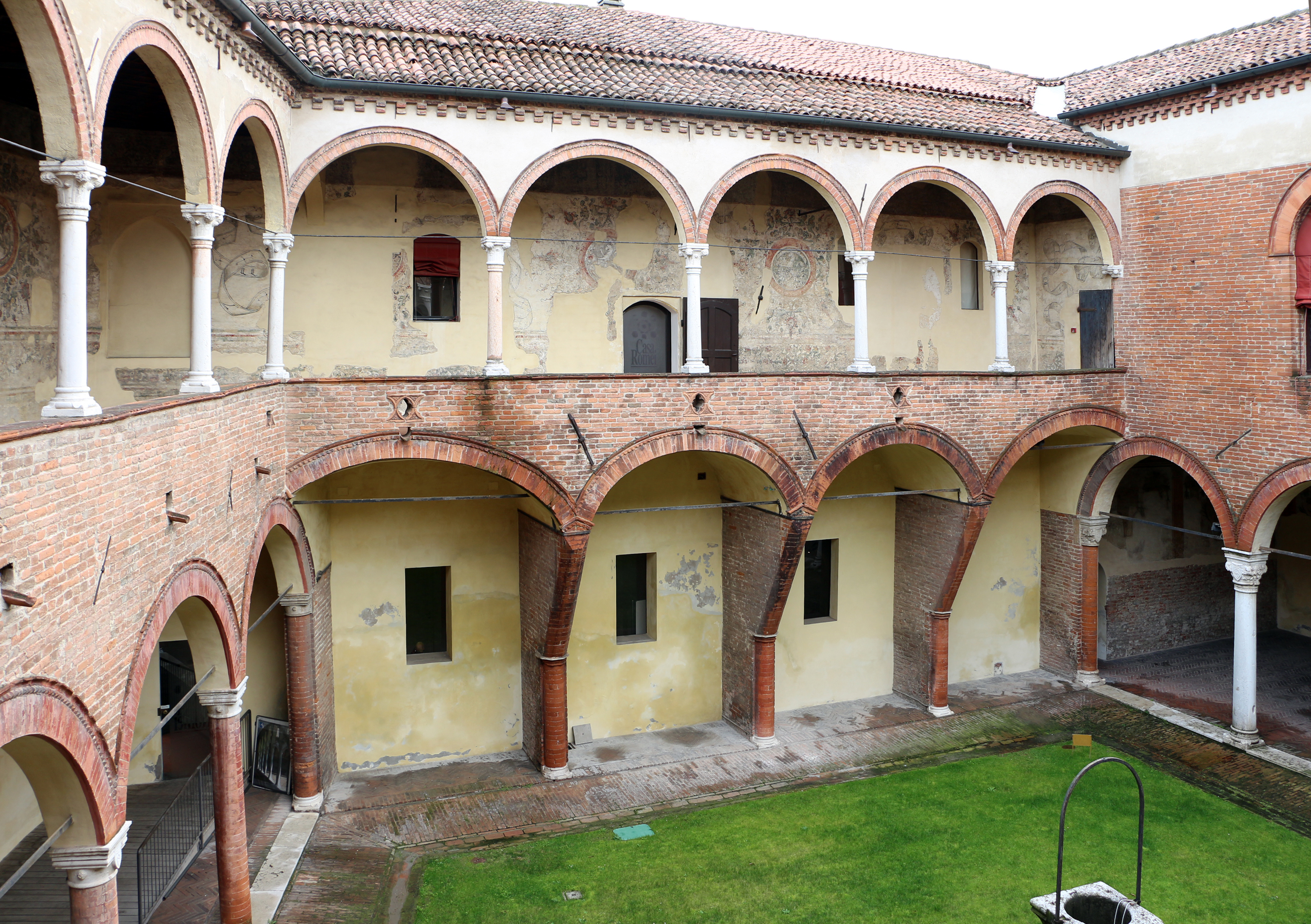
Casa Romei, Ferrara

A baldresca is an architectural element supporting a loggia. The element is of the medieval tradition and looks like a shelf with a supporting function. A baldresca has no columns.

== Examples ==
A notable example of the use of baldrescas is in the Casa Romei (a 15th-century building located in Ferrara, known precisely for a peculiar mixture of medieval and Renaissance elements), where they support the east loggia.

== Gallery ==
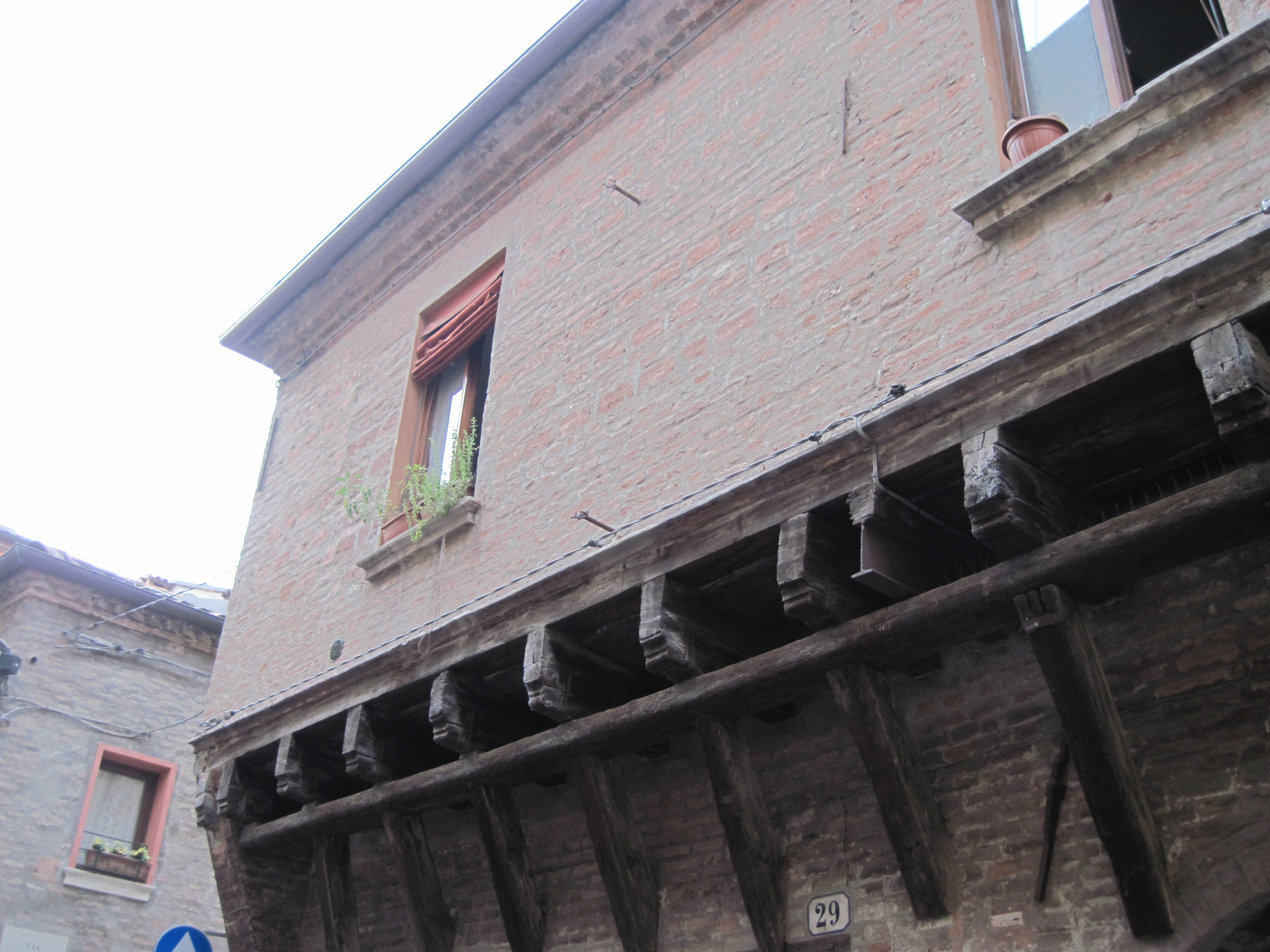
Medieval house in Ferrara

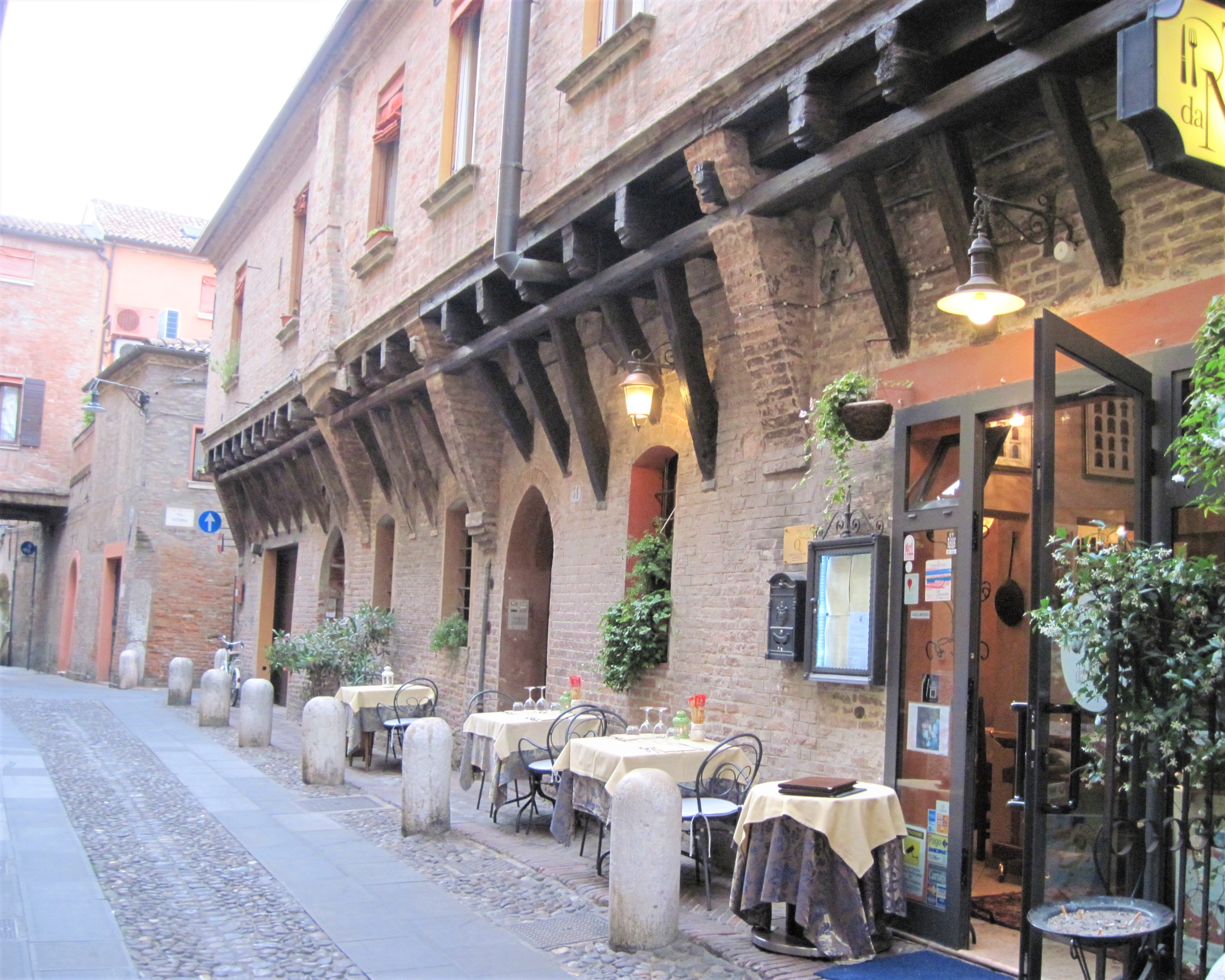
Medieval house in Ferrara

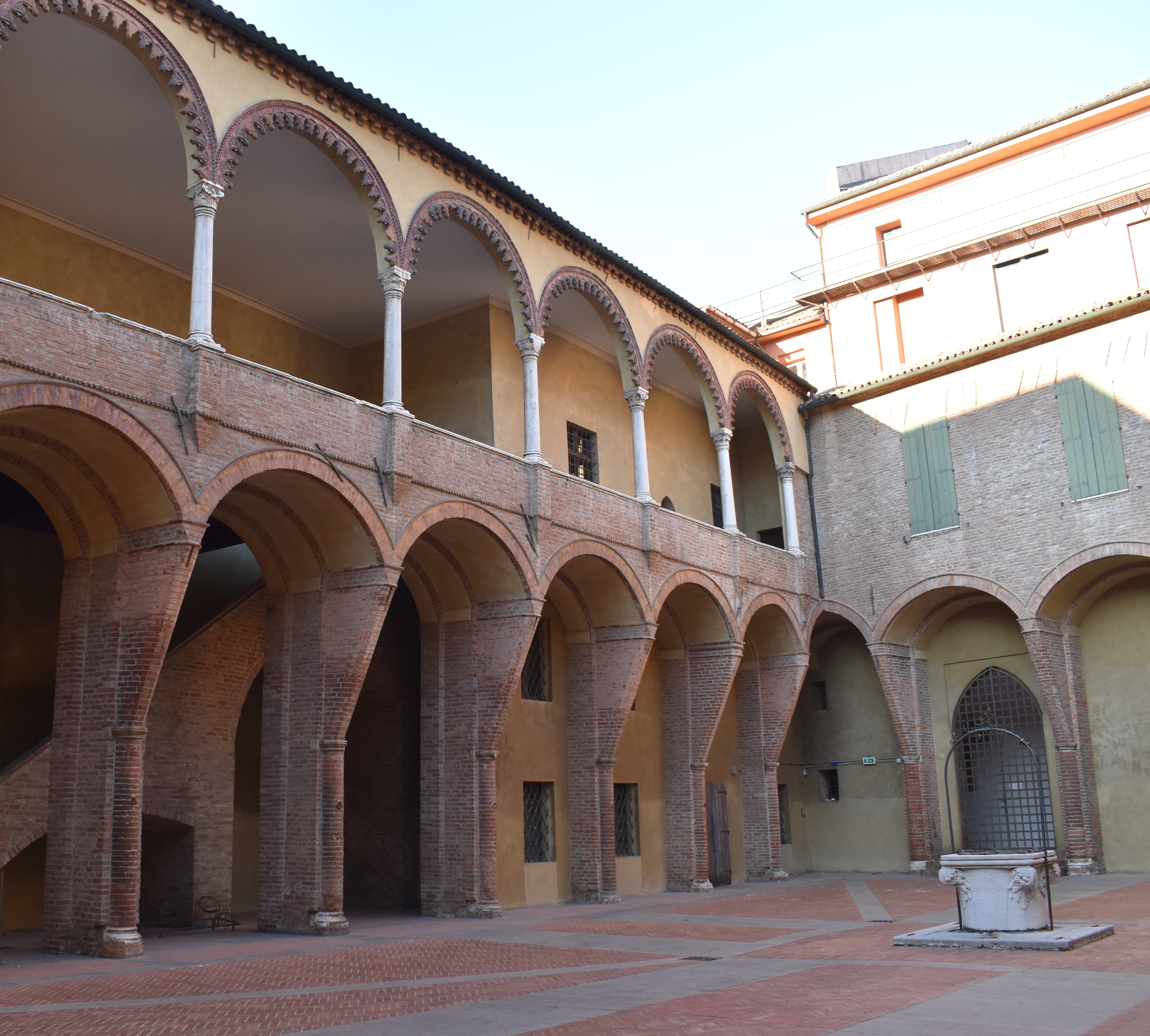
Courtyard of Palazzo Muzzarelli Crema in Ferrara

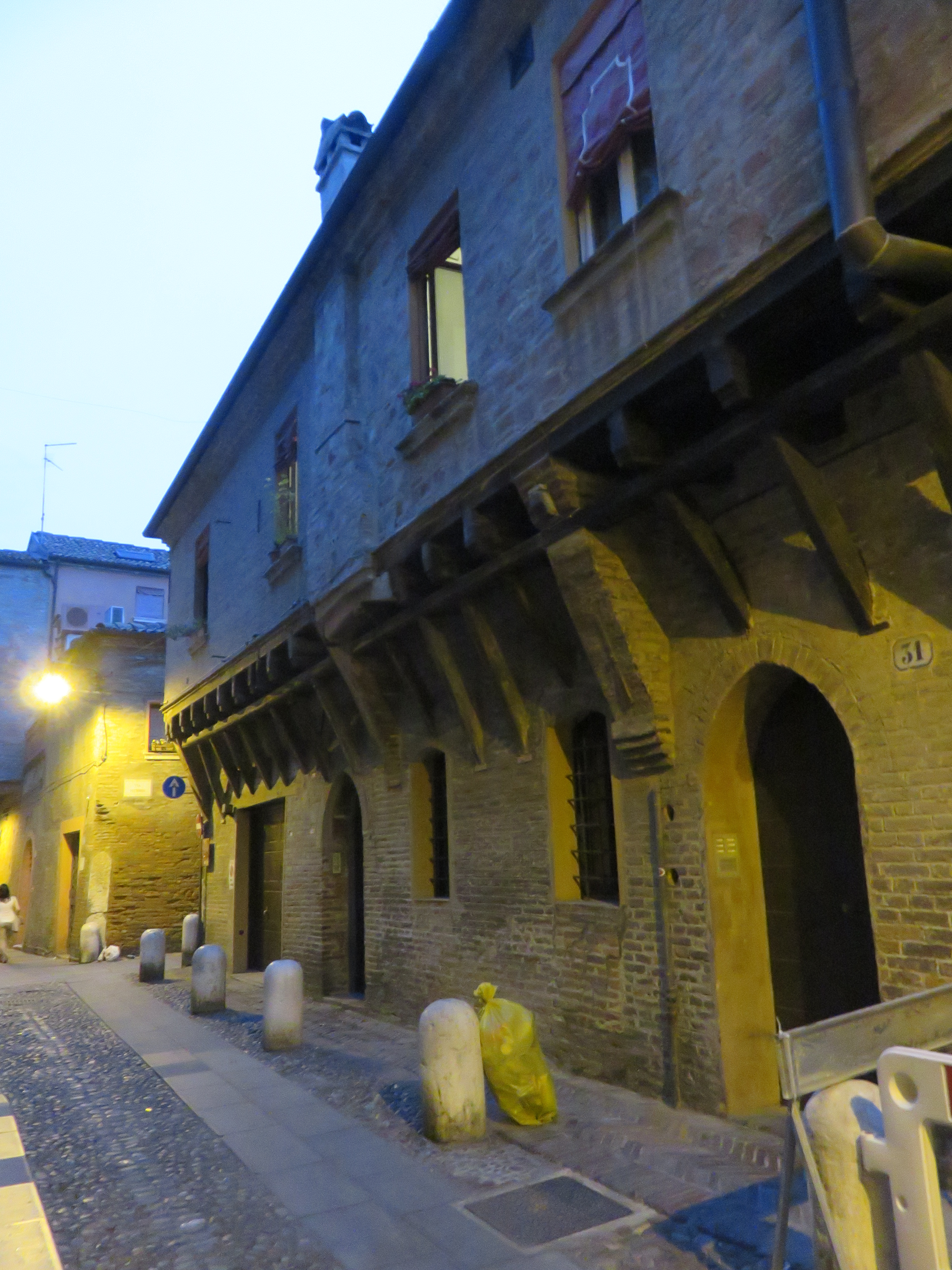
Medieval house in Ferrara

== See also ==
- Gallery
- Loggia
- Overhang
- Peristyle
