= European Panel Federation =

- Abbreviation: EPF
- Formation: 1999
- Type: Trade association
- Purpose: Representation of the European wood-based panels industry
- Headquarters: Brussels
- Region served: Europe
- Website: https://europanels.org/

The European Panel Federation (EPF) is a Brussels-based trade association that represents manufacturers of wood-based panels in Europe, including particleboard, oriented strand board (OSB), fibreboard, hardboard and softboard.

The federation coordinates sectoral positions on European Union legislation, publishes market information, and participates in technical, environmental and standardisation discussions affecting the industry.

== History ==
The federation was created in 1999 through the consolidation of several existing European-level organisations representing manufacturers of particleboard and medium-density fibreboard. Its establishment coincided with a period of restructuring in the European wood-processing sector, driven by increasing trade integration and the emergence of EU-level environmental and product-safety regulations.

== Structure and activities ==
EPF’s membership consists of national industry associations, individual producers, and supplier or research organisations associated with the wood panel sector. The federation’s members collectively represent a majority of European production capacity for particleboard, MDF and OSB.

Across its membership, the European wood-based panels industry is estimated to support more than 100,000 direct jobs, with additional employment in forestry, transport, adhesives and resin supply, and furniture manufacturing. EPF engages in a variety of activities relevant to the sector:

=== Policy and advocacy ===
The federation provides industry input to EU institutions on matters such as the EU Green Deal, energy and climate policy, circular-economy legislation, and construction-product regulation.

=== Technical and standardisation work ===
It contributes to discussions in European and international standardisation bodies, particularly concerning emissions, product performance, recycling and health-related standards for wood-based panels.

=== Research and innovation ===
EPF members participate in research consortia on material efficiency, panel recycling and bio-based adhesives, often supported by EU research programmes such as Horizon Europe.

=== Events and publications ===
EPF contributes to or co-organises scientific and technical conferences, including the European Wood-Based Panel Symposium, a long-running biennial event attended by researchers, producers and policy representatives.

The federation issues statistical summaries, market reports and technical position papers used by policymakers, researchers and industry stakeholders. Much of its data is also incorporated into broader European and international market reviews.

== Relations with other organisations ==
EPF cooperates with international and European bodies in the forest-based and construction sectors, including the UNECE/FAO Forestry and Timber Section, CEI-Bois, and the European Confederation of Woodworking Industries. It also engages with certification and sustainability frameworks in discussions on wood sourcing, life-cycle assessment and circularity.

As a lobbying organisation, EPF has been part of broader debates over EU policies on biomass use, carbon accounting, formaldehyde regulation and waste-wood recycling. Academic and NGO analyses often contrast industry positions with environmental or public-health concerns, highlighting differing interpretations of sustainability, circular economy priorities and risk management.

== See also ==
- Wood industry
- Wood-based panels
