= Pressed wood =

Construction material made from wood

Pressed wood, also known as presswood, is any engineered wood building and furniture construction material made from wood shavings and particles, sawdust or wood fibers bonded together with an adhesive under heat and pressure. This makes it different from densified wood, which is solid wood that has been compressed to increase its strength and possibly modify other properties.

Pressed wood can also contains strips of wood veneers. Panels that are laminated from sheets of veneer are usually known as plywood.

== Manufacturing process ==
=== Preparations of the veneers ===
The creation of pressed wood begins with the veneers being placed in a rotary dryer. This dryer is typically heated with steam at around 204 °C (400 °F). This process prepares the veneers for the humidifying process in which the veneers are then placed into humidification chambers. These humidification chambers have a precise moisture content.

=== Applying adhesive to the veneers ===
After the veneers have been prepared, resin adhesive is applied to the top of the veneer and then rolled for equal distribution on top of the veneer. Next, another veneer with a perpendicular grain pattern is applied on top. This process is then repeated until the desired thickness of the board is met.

=== Pressing ===
Once the board is at its desired thickness, the board is placed into a press, where the board is pressed and heated. This process gives pressed wood its strength advantage over other engineered wood types.

The boards are placed in a press where the press will press down on the boards with roughly 2.8 megapascals (400 psi) of pressure. At the same time, the boards will also be heated up to 149 °C (300 °F)—this heat and pressure cause the adhesive to cure, forming the finished board.

== Applications of pressed wood ==
=== Construction ===
Presswood is very commonly used in the construction of houses and other buildings. Because of pressed wood's high strength and versatility, it works very well for structural constructions.

=== Pallets ===
Pressed wood is a very common material used to make wooden pallets. This is because of how cheap pressed wood can be and how pallets can easily be constructed out of pressed wood.

=== Furniture ===
Because of pressed wood's strength and versatility, it works very well for structural parts of furniture.

== See also ==
- Fiberboard
- Glued laminated timber
- Hardboard
- Haskelite
- Laminated veneer lumber
- Masonite
- Medium-density fiberboard
- Oriented strand board
- Particle board
- Plywood
