= Defibrator =

Machine for refining fibres

The defibrator or wood pulp refiner is a machine used as part of the manufacturing process for MDF, HDF man-made wooden board and paper. It produces fine wooden fibres, finer than the cut chips used to make chipboard. Although small, these fibres retain good structural integrity.

The machine itself is a thermo mechanical pulping refiner in which the pulp material, such as wood chips, is ground in an environment of steam between a rotating grinding disc (rotor) and a stationary disc (stator) each with radial grooves that provides the grinding surface. Wood chips or pulp are fed into the centre and are broken down as the centrifugal force pushes them towards the circumference of the discs where the grooves are finer to produce wood fibre or only control the length of the fibers. The size of the refined fibres can to some extent be controlled by altering the distance between the discs where a closer distance produces finer fibres but also requires higher grinding force. The capacity per machine is largely determined by the size of the machine, as well as the motor speed, which can be 1,500 or 1,800 rpm. (Note: The precise machine speed is unimportant and these are merely the typical motor speeds for electric motors running on either 50 Hz or 60 Hz mains electricity.)

== History ==
In 1931 the Swedish engineer Arne Asplund filed a patent on a method to defibrate wood chips. As opposed to the Masonite-method, the defibrator-method (also known as the Asplund-method) uses pressurised steam to soften the wood chips, then grinding discs to pull the wood fibres apart. This grinding unit is what Asplund called the defibrator. It became the key product of his company, AB Defibrator. The Defibrator trademark is now held by Valmet, the successor of AB Defibrator, for its line of refiners for the panelboard industry.
