= Swiss wood industry =

Industrial sector in Switzerland

The Swiss wood industry encompasses the industrial, artisanal, and commercial activities of the wood sector in Switzerland. In 2001, the industry comprised 12,273 enterprises employing 78,400 workers.

Switzerland's forests contain over 500 million trees with an average wood reserve of 350 cubic meters per hectare, producing approximately 5 million cubic meters of harvested timber annually. Wood consumption in Switzerland totals about 10.5 million cubic meters per year, with roughly half used for energy purposes and the remainder divided between solid wood products and paper products. Approximately two-thirds of tree stands by volume consist of primarily coniferous forests, while one-third contains mainly deciduous trees. Spruce is by far the most common species in Swiss forests, followed by beech and fir. More wood grows in Swiss forests than is harvested or dies naturally, with annual harvest reaching approximately 5 million cubic meters.

== History ==
Until the mid-19th century, wood served as the principal energy source for households, crafts, and industry throughout Switzerland. The preindustrial era has been characterized as an "age of wood" due to the material's predominance in daily life. Evidence of wood commerce and timber rafting dates back to the Roman period on Lake Como, Lake Geneva, the Aare, and the Rhône. From the late 18th century, forests increasingly shifted toward production-oriented management focused on timber output, with traditional agricultural usage rights progressively excluded. This transformation coincided with the professionalization of forest management and the emergence of wood as a distinct economic sector.

The arrival of the railroad in the second half of the 19th century profoundly impacted the wood industry. Railways initially created substantial demand for wood products, particularly railway ties and bridges, but subsequently enabled the importation of inexpensive coal and foreign timber. After 1858, locomotives operated on coal rather than wood. Serial production in carpentry and furniture manufacturing began around 1850 and expanded after 1880 during the economic boom. In the 20th century, mechanized joinery extended to the production of doors, windows, and parquet flooring. The use of prefabricated workshop components, rather than pieces shaped on construction sites, allowed for reduced building costs.

=== Wood as fuel ===
Until the 19th century, rural populations with usage rights obtained their firewood from communal forests, while urban residents purchased wood at markets. Coal emerged as an alternative after 1850. By 1910, when the first energy statistics were compiled, coal covered 78% of Switzerland's energy needs compared to 16% for wood. During both World Wars, wood consumption increased under war economy regimes, reaching 27% of energy needs between 1940 and 1945. Wood use declined sharply against petroleum from the 1960s onward, falling to 1.8% in 2000. At the end of the 20th century, the search for alternative energies revitalized wood heating through new technologies such as pellet stoves.

Major consumers of firewood until the 19th century included tile and brick factories, foundries, glassworks, and salt works. Charcoal was particularly valued for its transportability—it possessed nearly the same energy value as the green wood used to produce it while weighing considerably less. Charcoal production increased during the Middle Ages for use in crafts, ironworking, and glassmaking. Forests distant from waterways often hosted charcoal production alongside potash factories and glassworks, sometimes leading to complete deforestation.

=== Construction and building ===
Wood has been used in construction since the Neolithic period. Lake dwellings consisted of wooden structures supporting an interlacing of branches and straw sealed with clay. In the late 20th century, Bronze Age pilings dating to 1525 BC were discovered in Lake Zurich near Rapperswil, supporting one of Europe's oldest bridges, sturdy enough for livestock and vehicle passage. During the Early Middle Ages, peasant houses, manor buildings, and numerous churches were constructed of wood. As late as the 12th and 13th centuries, most buildings were wooden assemblages, legally classified as movable property. North of the Alps, stone was reserved for religious architecture, later extending to town halls and prestigious buildings. Horizontal plank construction dominated in coniferous regions, while post construction prevailed in deciduous areas. Shingle roofs were common north of the Alps. Some surviving wooden houses contain elements nearly 700 years old. In Ticino, except in northern valleys, stone construction generally persisted uninterrupted from antiquity. In the Alps, combinations of wood and stone predominated. The Swiss chalet, in the form it assumed during the 19th century, became a nationally recognized symbol abroad. Fire risks prompted cities to replace wood with stone during the late Middle Ages.

In Alemannic cities, building trades organized into guilds. Some particularly skilled carpenters gained reputations as architects or master builders beyond their regions, with many becoming building contractors in the 19th century. Despite efforts by the working group Lignum and engineers who developed rationalized and standardized avant-garde architecture in the 1930s, wood continued losing ground in 20th-century construction. Responding to the industry's crisis beginning in 1970, Lignum promoted wood use in housing, industrial buildings, halls, churches, and bridges with assistance from prominent Swiss architects. Since the 1980s, increases in companies and employment in this domain—contrasting with the general industry trend—attest to the initiative's success. During the 1990s, values associated with wood shifted from evoking lost domestic intimacy to appreciation as a multifunctional, practical material.

=== Wood crafts and products ===
Wood has always served for utilitarian objects, though very ancient specimens are rare due to specific preservation requirements. Underwater archaeology demonstrates that prehistoric peoples primarily used hardwoods—oak, beech, ash, maple, yew, and fruit trees—for tool manufacturing. During the Middle Ages and early modern period, rural areas consumed enormous quantities of wood for stakes and palisades. Stakes removed after harvest to permit common pasture dried during summer and subsequently fueled hearths. Wood served as raw material for tools, furniture, barrels, and presses. Until the 20th century, it was used for interior fittings (floors, wainscoting, doors, window frames) and all types of furniture custom-made by joiners established in both cities and countryside. Artistically crafted pieces for churches and public buildings required cabinetmakers, marquetry workers, and carvers—privileged urban artisans whose clientele also included wealthy individuals seeking precious furniture. In the 19th century, wood remained ubiquitous in household utensils, craft and agricultural tools, tableware, storage and transport barrels, mill equipment, boats, carts, and carriages. Specialized artisans including coopers, wheelwrights, and turners appeared during the Middle Ages.

Wood sculpture at home, launched in the Bernese Oberland (Brienz) during the 1816–1817 famine, represents a special case. Production sold mainly to tourists as souvenirs provided supplementary income highly dependent on economic conditions, with employment varying from 1,307 workers in 1884 to 614 in 1930 and 405 in 1939.

=== Wood commerce ===
By the Middle Ages, both timber and firewood were subjects of commerce. However, before the railway era, land transport proved extremely costly, favoring waterway transport. The rafting capacity of rivers and lakes determined the location of dependent operations. Firewood could only be harvested within a raftable river basin and reshipped from a riverside locality. Wood exports from Switzerland are documented from the 13th century. Cities on the Swiss Plateau, the forest-poor Rhineland, the Rhône Valley, and the Po Valley constantly demanded firewood and timber. Like Engadine, which supplied the salt works at Hall in Tirol, entire regions lived from exports. In the 15th or 16th centuries, cities began regulating prices at their markets. Facing increasing needs, Zurich and Bern sought to impose official commerce controls. The railroad's arrival in the second half of the 19th century had dual influence: it first created very strong demand for railway ties and bridges, then enabled importation of inexpensive coal and wood, fundamentally altering traditional commerce patterns and market structures.

=== Resource management ===
Forests near industries with high wood consumption were often overexploited. Elias Landolt compiled the first statistical data on this matter, showing that in 1858–1860, forests overall (Alps, Prealps, Jura) covered only 85% of needs, with Appenzell Ausserrhoden's forests at 32% and Vaud Jura's at 156%. Supply remained consistently tense in regions where rafting was difficult. In the 18th century, the poor condition of Swiss forests increasingly prompted complaints and predictions of shortages. Before the 19th century, local differences were substantial. Some regions experienced difficult situations due to pressure from urban centers or preindustrial operations requiring large quantities of timber and firewood, while others had surpluses. The widespread fear of shortages in the 18th and 19th centuries marked consciousness and had political repercussions, legitimizing forest laws. In reality, the main shortage concerned long timber for construction due to the relative rarity of tall timber forests before 1800. Subsequently, industrialization utilized other energy sources. Wood alone could not have ensured economic growth.

=== Industrialization ===
Today, a large portion of the wood sector from sawing to cellulose transformation is industrialized. Small and medium-sized highly mechanized enterprises have predominated since the early 20th century despite occasional concentration movements, with 12,273 operations employing 78,400 workers in 2001. Sawn timber volume remained stable between 1946 and 1996. Several mills capable of producing paper from wood pulp or cellulose established themselves between 1860 and 1890, primarily between Basel, Bern, Lucerne, and Zurich. They found sufficient raw material in Switzerland to cover one to two-thirds of their needs. This activity expanded significantly after World War II, as did production of fiberboard and particle board.

== Organizations and professional training ==
Industry actors are grouped in numerous organizations. The main ones include the Swiss Association of Sawmills and Wood Industry (founded 1886), the Swiss Federation of Master Joiners and Furniture Manufacturers (1887), and the Swiss Society of Master Carpenters (1906). The Lignum association (1931) and the Swiss Conference on Wood Economy (1996) have formed, since 1999, the umbrella organization for the Swiss forest and wood sector, with a Romandy office, the Centre dendrotechnique (Cedotec). Since 1997, the University of Applied Sciences in Biel/Bienne has offered higher education in wood technology and timber construction.

== Bibliography ==
- Romano, C.M. L'industrie du bois dans le canton de Fribourg, 1969
- Grossmann, H. Flösserei und Holzhandel aus den Schweizer Bergen bis zum Ende des 19. Jahrhunderts, 1972
- Marek, D. Kohle, 1992
- Cavaciocchi, S., ed. L'uomo e la foresta, secc. XIII-XVIII, 1996
- Parolini, J.D. Zur Geschichte der Waldnutzung im Gebiet des heutigen Schweizerischen Nationalparks, 1996
- Mirabdolbaghi, A.; Pelet, P.L. "L'inventaire des usines hydrauliques traditionnelles du Valais", in Vallesia, 52, 1997, pp. 169-239
