= Hardboard =

Type of fiberboard (engineered wood product)

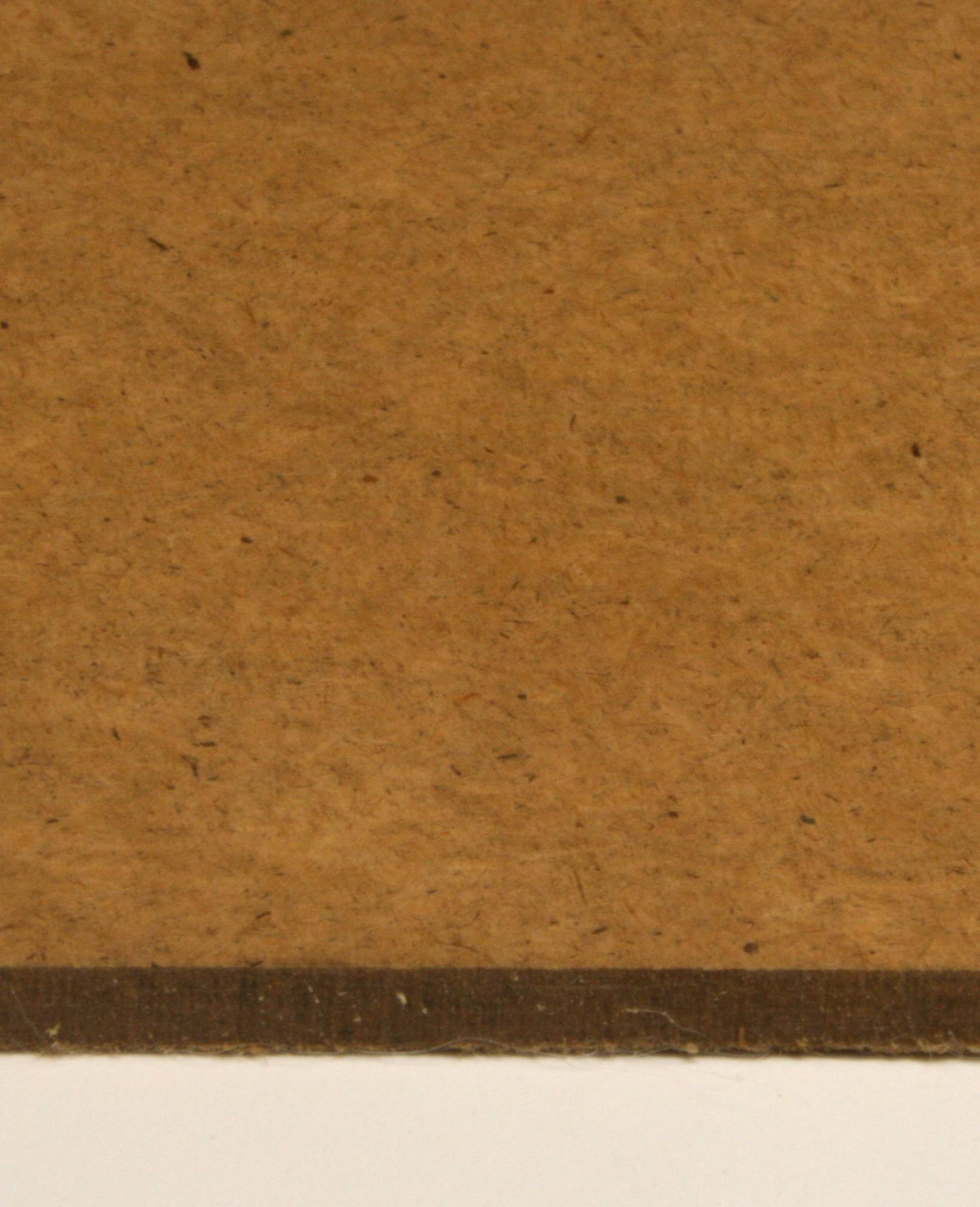
A section of hardboard

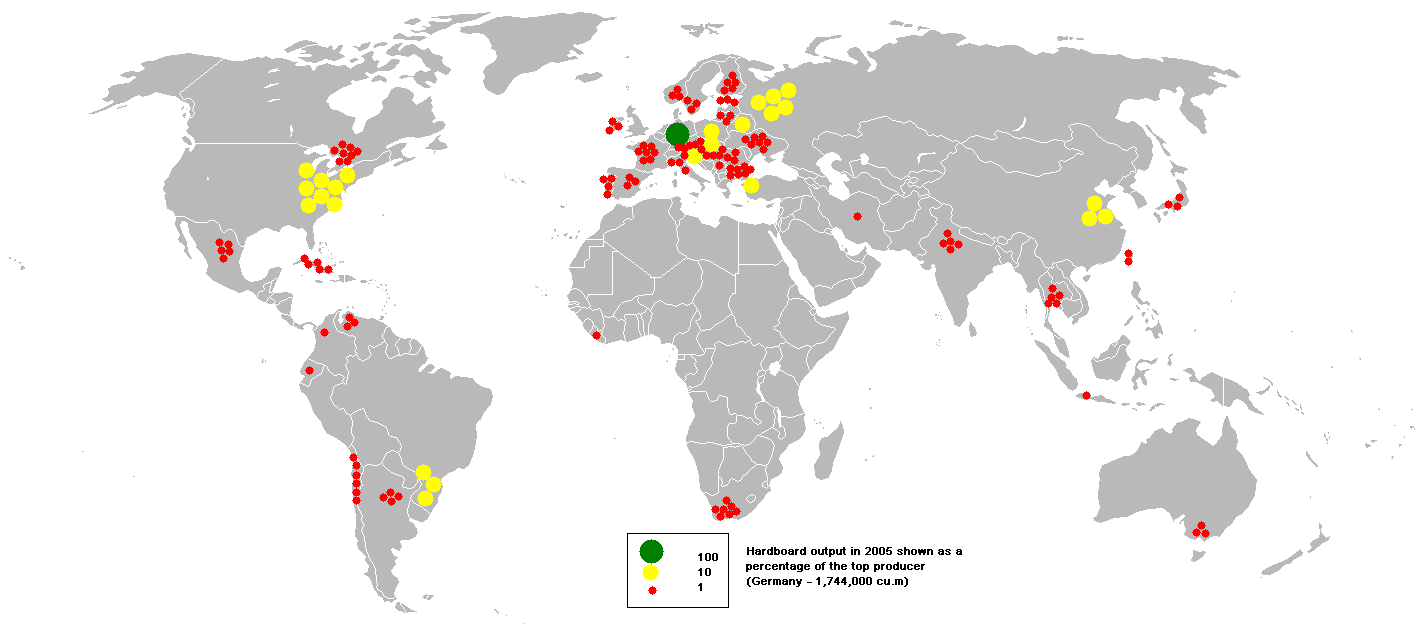
Hardboard output in 2005

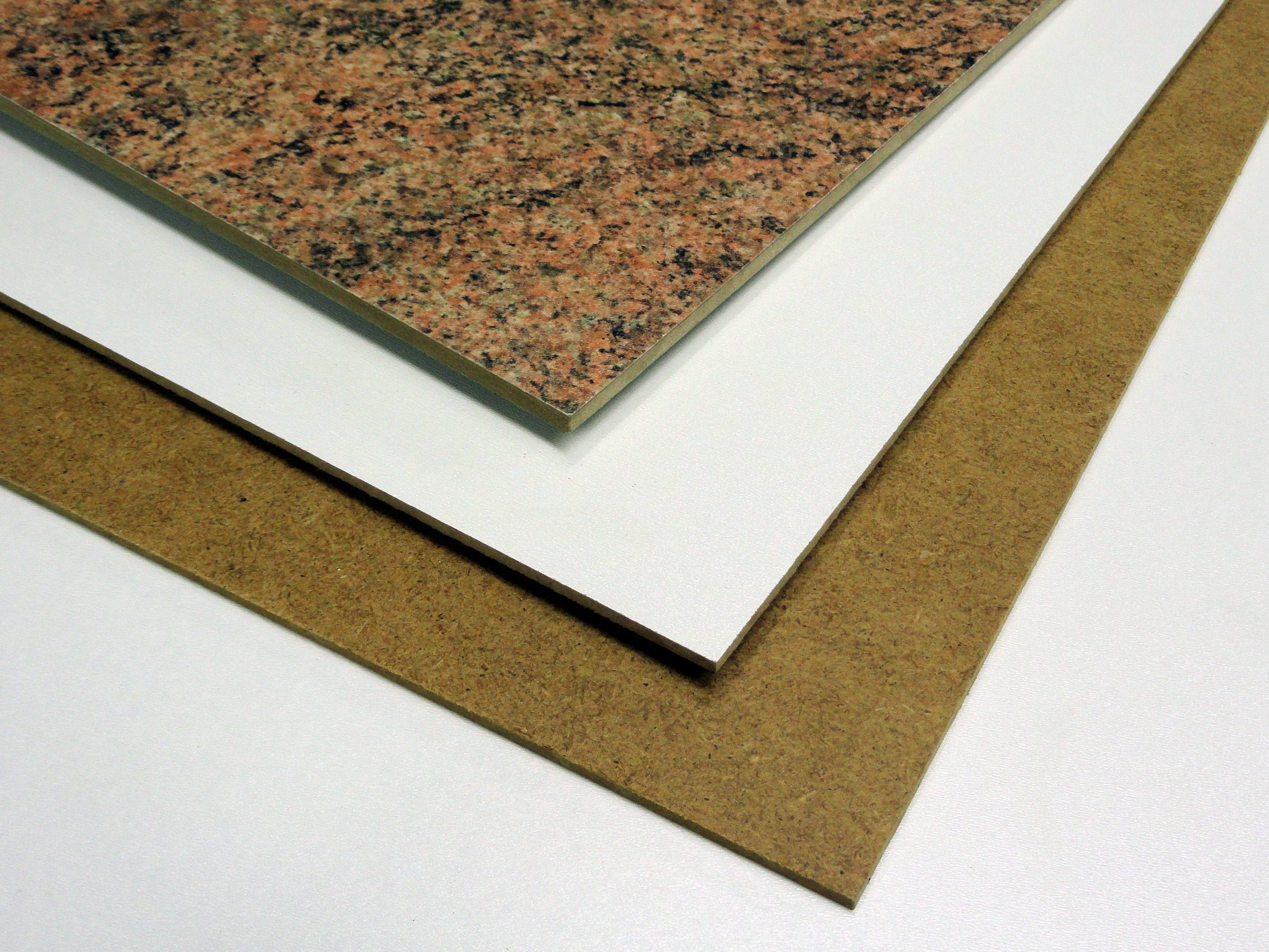
Hardboard

Hardboard, also called high-density fiberboard (HDF), is a type of fiberboard, which is a pressed wood or engineered wood product. It is used in furniture and in the construction industry.

== Description ==
Hardboard is similar to particle board and medium-density fiberboard, but is denser, stronger and harder because it is made out of exploded wood fibers that have been highly compressed.

The density of hardboard is higher than 500 kg/m^{3} (31 lb/cu ft), usually about 800–1,040 kg/m^{3} (50–65 lb/cu ft). It differs from particle board and medium-density fiberboard in that the bonding of the wood fibers requires no additional adhesive, the original lignin in the wood fibers sufficing to bond the hardboard together, although resin is often added.

Hardboard is produced in either a wet or dry process. The wet process, known as the Mason Method, leaves one smooth side and one textured side as a wire mesh is used to allow moisture to escape. Dry processed hardboard is smooth on both sides. Masonite is produced using the wet process only. In Europe today, the same type of fibreboard product generated by the wet process, is named as Natural Fibre Board, and this is a registered trademark.

== History ==
A product resembling hardboard was first made in England in 1898 by hot pressing waste paper. In the 1900s, fiber building board of relatively low density was manufactured in Canada. At around the same time the first commercially produced MDF was developed in 1966 in Deposit, New York, United States. In the early 1920s, improved methods of compressing wet wood pulp at high temperatures resulted in a higher density product.

== Uses ==
Unlike solid wood, hardboard is very homogeneous with no grain. A wood veneer can be glued onto it to give the appearance of solid wood. Other overlays include Formica, laminated papers, and vinyl. It has many uses, such as a substrate. It is used in construction, flooring, furniture, home appliances, automobiles and cabinetry, and is popular among acrylic and oil painters as a painting surface due to its economical price (though it must be coated with gesso or canvas before use). Hardboard has often been used as the surface material in clipboards, especially older models. It is also used as the final layer in many skateboard ramps and the half-pipe. Hardboard is also used extensively in theatrical environments, often used as the final painted surface of a stage and on walking surfaces of constructed scenery. Hardboard is also used to make puzzles, game boards, and other toys.

Tempered hardboard is a hardboard that has been coated with a thin film of linseed oil and then baked; this gives it more water resistance, impact resistance, hardness, rigidity and tensile strength. An earlier tempering process involved immersing the board in linseed oil or tung oil until it was 5 to 6 percent saturated, and heating to 170 °C (338 °F). Tempered hardboard is used in construction siding.

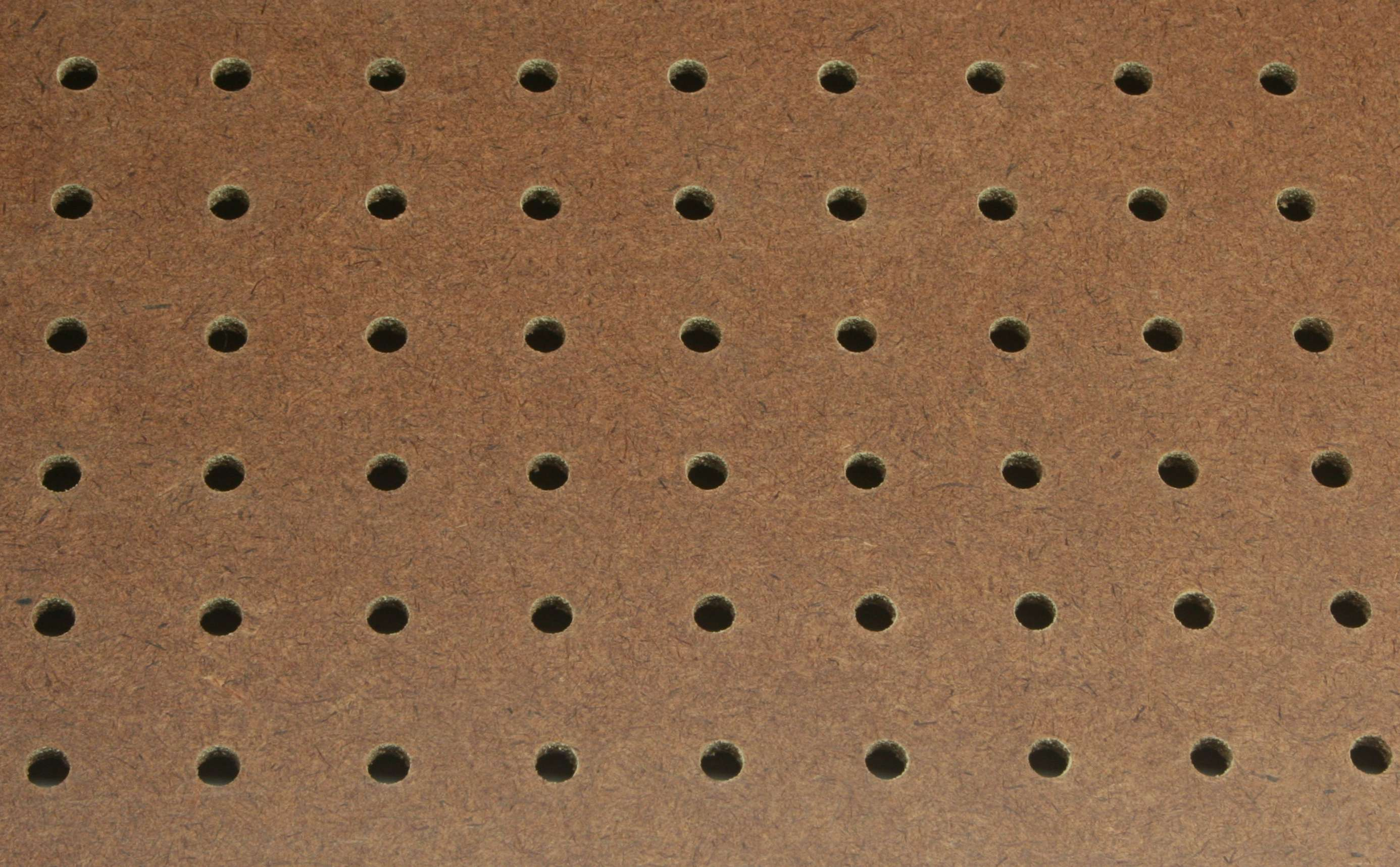
Perforated hardboard

Perforated hardboard, also called pegboard, is tempered hardboard that has a uniform array of 1/8-or-1/4-inch (3.2 or 6.4 mm) holes in it, into which tool-hanging hooks or store fixtures can be placed.

Hardboard has become less popular in the construction industry in recent years due to new environmental targets to procure more sustainable temporary protection materials.

As one side of 'natural fibreboard' is unlacquered, soft and porous , lightly spraying it with water before putting it down on a (slightly) uneven surface will make it mould to that uneven shape to make the whole board then present a smooth surface on the other side, one use for this technique is eliminating unevenness from old floorboards when laying carpet.

== See also ==
- Masonite – Engineered wood made of steamed and pressure-molded fibers
- Fibro (fibrous asbestos cement board)
- Glued laminated timber
- Oriented strand board
- Plywood
- Pressed wood

== Works cited ==
- Akers, L. E. (1966). Particle Board and Hardboard. Oxford: Pergamon Press. OCLC 1097718.
- Frane, J. T. (1994). Craftsman's Illustrated Dictionary of Construction Terms. Carlsbad, CA: Craftsman Book. OCLC 35958421.
