= Natural Fibre Board =

Type of fibreboard without any synthetic resin

Natural Fibre Board (NFB), or otherwise natural fibreboard or natural fiberboard, is a registered European trademark representing wood fibre boards produced without the use of binding agents – for instance, it contains no formaldehyde-based resins or other synthetic resins.

It is a European wood-based panel, which belongs to the fibreboards; in the past, it was typically called hardboard, and that name is also still in use. Technically this is a wet-process fibreboard glued only with the natural lignin of the wood material itself.

The trademark is licensed to the European Panel Federation (EPF), an organization that represents all European manufacturers of hardboard and softboard using the wet-process system. These manufacturers adhere to stringent product characteristics and production process criteria.

== Manufacturing process ==
NFB hardboard and softboard products are manufactured by a specialized industry using exclusively pure wood fibres. The production process involves a thermo-mechanical treatment that re-polymerizes the lignin —nature's glue found within wood—which naturally binds the wood fibres without the need for synthetic adhesives or resins containing formaldehyde or isocyanate resin. As a result, NFB products are considered formaldehyde-free, clean, and safe for human health. These fibreboard products are completely recyclable and biodegradable.

The final uses of the NFB boards include, among other things, furniture manufacturing, building construction, and thermal and acoustic insulation.

== Products ==
There are actually two (2) different types of panels produced today.

- NFB hardboard: This fibreboard is formed by high-pressure compression and temperature during a pressing process. Thus, the high-density boards satisfy demanding applications as a result of tempering or other treatments that achieve great physical and mechanical characteristics and excellent dimensional stability.
- NFB softboard: a fibreboard which is a good insulating material against the cold. Such a wet process-manufactured softboard also protects against summer heat, and its high heat storage capacity helps prevent indoor overheating during the summer months.

== Environmental impact ==
Natural fibreboard is recognized as an eco-friendly product. According to the data of EPF, on average, the use of NFB in a single house can save up to 2 tons of CO_{2}, an amount equivalent to that absorbed by a 750 m^{2} forest area. NFB as a product has received a certification, ensuring that such fibreboards manufactured by EPF members comply with all relevant European health and environmental standards.

== See also ==
- Medium-density fibreboard
- Hardboard
- Solid wood
