= Fiberboard =

Engineered wood product made out of wood fibers

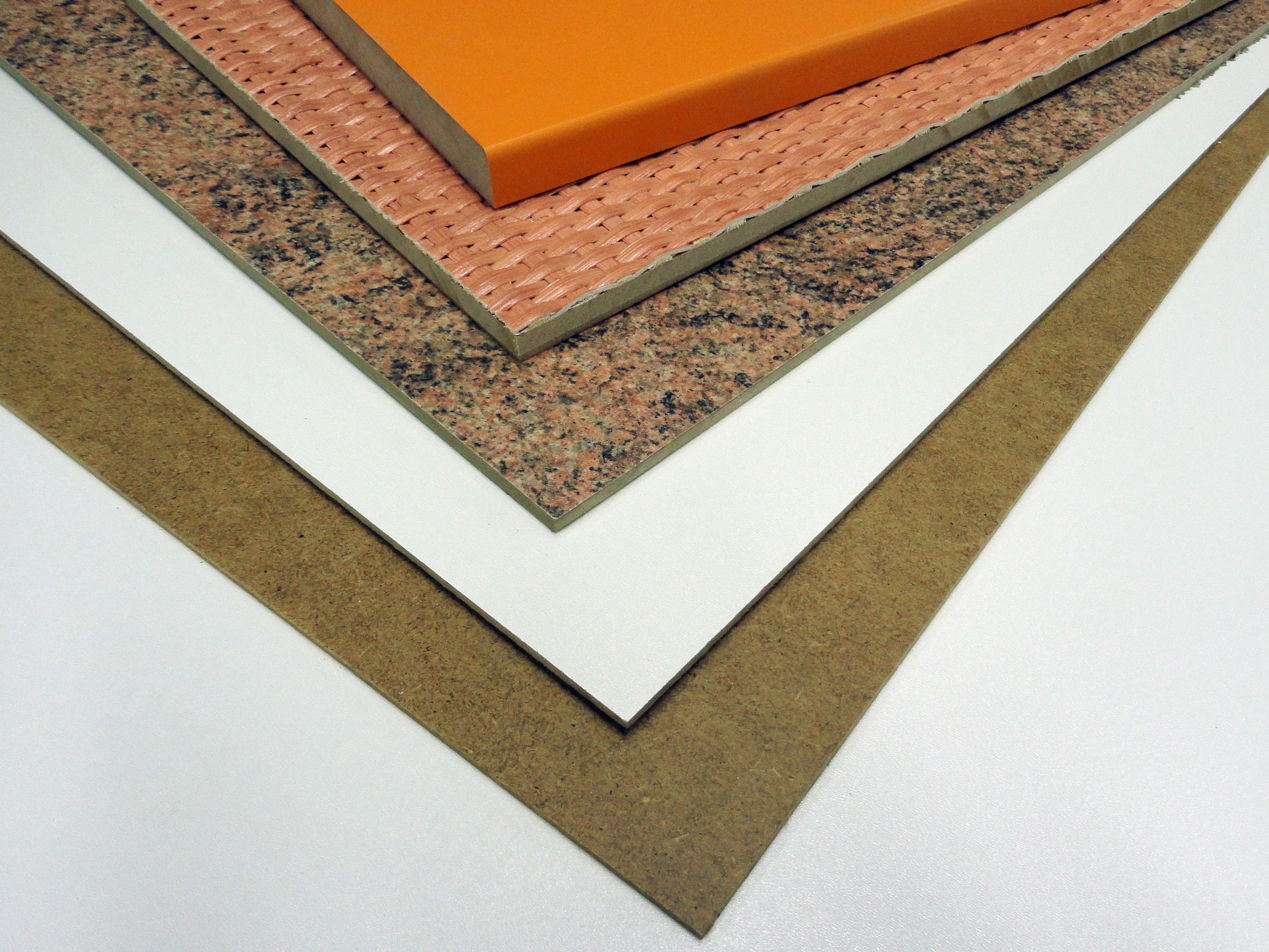
Medium-density fiberboard or MDF (topmost two), and hardboard (bottommost three)

Fiberboard (American English) or fibreboard (Commonwealth English) is a type of engineered wood product that is made out of wood fibers. Types of fiberboard (in order of increasing density) include particle board or low-density fiberboard (LDF), medium-density fiberboard (MDF), and hardboard or high-density fiberboard (HDF).

It is sometimes used as a synonym for particle board, but particle board usually refers to low-density fiberboard. Plywood is not a type of fiberboard, as it is made of thin sheets of wood, not wood fibers or particles. Fiberboard, particularly medium-density fiberboard, is heavily used in the furniture industry. For pieces that will be visible, a veneer of wood is often glued onto fiberboard to give it the appearance of conventional wood.

In the packaging industry, the term "fiberboard" is often used to describe cardboard, a tough kraft-based paperboard or corrugated fiberboard for boxes.

"Fiberboard" is also an intermediate product, an output of a pulp mill used as input for a paper mill.

== Manufacture ==
Fiberboard manufacture begins with wood chipping: fresh or recycled wood material is cut and sorted to small pieces of similar size. Chips are washed to remove things such as dirt and sand. Metal scraps such as nails can be removed with a magnet placed over a conveyor belt on which the chips move forward. In the case of, for example, MDF (medium density fiberboard) and not particle board, chips are then steamed to soften them for defibration. Small amount of paraffin wax is added to the steamed chips and they are transformed into fluffy fibers in a defibrator and soon afterwards sprayed with adhesives such as urea-formaldehyde (UF) or Phenol formaldehyde resin (PF). Wax prevents fibers from clumping together during storage. Chips in the case of particle board are also sprayed with a suitable adhesive before the next steps. Fibers or chips are arranged into a uniform "mat" on a conveyor belt. This mat is pre-compressed and then hot-pressed. Hot-pressing activates the adhesive and glues the fibers or chips together. Board is then cooled, trimmed, sanded and maybe veneered or laminated.

UF resins are dominantly used in the MDF industry because of their low cost and fast curing characteristics. However, pressures on the use of UF resins are mounting steadily due to potential problems associated with formaldehyde emission. On the other hand, PF resins are more durable and do not emit formaldehyde after cure. The industry has traditionally shied away from using PF resins due primarily to their higher cost and much slower curing rate than UF resins. However, the press times for PF-bonded fiberboard can be substantially reduced by manipulating the fiber mat temperatures, molecular weight distribution of PF resins and pressing parameters. As a result, the press times for PF-bonded fiberboard can be made comparable to those for UF-bonded fiberboard. Also, the resin content required for PF-bonded fiberboard is less than 5% to achieve a good board quickly. This is considerably lower than that required for UF-bonded fiberboard.

Certain types of fiberboard can be considered "green" building products. Consisting of bio-based, secondary raw materials (wood chip or sugarcane fibers) recovered from within 100 miles (160 km) of manufacturing facilities, the binding agent used in this type of fiberboard is an all-natural product, consisting of vegetable starch containing no added formaldehydes.

== Use ==
Fiberboard, classified by ASTM C208, Standard Specification for Cellulosic Fiber Insulating Board, has many benefits and is used in residential and commercial construction.

Applications include:

- sound proofing/deadening
- structural sheathing
- low-slope roofing
- sound deadening flooring underlayment

Fiberboard is also used in the automotive industry to create free-form shapes such as dashboards, rear parcel shelves, and inner door shells. These pieces are usually covered with a skin, foil, or fabric such as cloth, suede, leather, or polyvinyl chloride.

RSI Direct, a bi-weekly e-newsletter covering the roofing, siding and insulation industries, promotes the use of fiberboard as a coverboard in roof systems:

More than two billion square feet of this product have been installed in the U.S. roofing market.

== Recycle ==
Currently, there is no commercially available method to recycle fibreboard, and landfilling and burning for energy are the main disposal methods.

The challenges of recycling fibreboard include:

- Sorting fibreboard waste
- Reduced fibre properties
- Contaminants in recycled materials
- Economical considerations

== See also ==
- Beaverboard
- Corrugated fiberboard
- Hardboard
- Homasote
- Masonite
- Oriented strand board
- Paperboard
- Particle board
- Plywood
- Pressed wood
