= Solid wood =

Wood without hollow spaces

Solid wood is a term most commonly used to distinguish between ordinary lumber and engineered wood, but it also refers to structures that do not have hollow spaces. Engineered wood products are manufactured by binding together wood strands, fibers, or veneers with adhesives to form a composite material. Engineered wood includes plywood, oriented strand board (OSB) and fiberboard. Products made from solid wood are often promoted in advertisements. However, using solid wood has advantages and disadvantages.

== Comparison with engineered wood ==
Perhaps the greatest advantage of solid wood is that the wood is the same all the way through, so repairs are relatively easy. Repairs to veneer are much more difficult and sometimes impossible.

Solid wood furniture is strong enough to easily satisfy all furniture applications, and it can last for centuries, Plywood and other engineered wood products used to make furniture are typically covered with a veneer such as Cherry.

It is common today for furniture manufacturers and retailers to advertise such veneered plywood furniture as made of "wood solids with cherry veneers". Most customers believe that to mean solid planks of less expensive woods such as poplar, etc., with expensive woods such as cherry used for veneers. However, "wood solids" is a term of art. The "wood solids" are simply plywood, or another engineered wood product.

In the US, the Federal Trade Commission doesn't allow furniture to be advertised as made of "solid wood" unless all exposed surfaces are in fact solid wood. Solid wood is expensive. Engineered wood (often advertised as wood solids) is not.

== Solid wood vs. hollow wood ==
One of the most frequently made hollow wood structures are hollow core doors. Hollow core doors are much lighter than solid wood doors, cheaper and are easier to install. However, sound travels more freely through them, which can be a problem if the house is noisy or the occupants desire a lot of privacy. Also, hollow core doors should not be used as doors to the outside because they can more easily be broken open by robbers. Solid wood doors are slightly more fire resistant because the fire has to burn through more material, however, using a steel door will increase fire resistance by a much larger margin.
