= Max Himmelheber =

German inventor and fighter pilot

Max Himmelheber (24 April 1904 in Karlsruhe, Baden – 17 December 2000, Baiersbronn, Baden) was a German inventor and Luftwaffe fighter pilot.

== Biography ==
In 1932, Himmelheber invented particle board.

During the Second World War Himmelheber served as pilot in the fighter unit Jagdgeschwader 2. During the Battle of Britain he was a leutnant and technical officer of Stab.I/JG 2 (staff flight of the I group of JG 2). He had one victory on 30 August 1940, over an RAF Hurricane near Goudhurst. He was shot down himself on 6 September 1940, over Staplehurst, Kent, and became a POW at Woolwich Hospital.
