= Arne Asplund =

Swedish inventor

- Born: 1903
- Died: 1993 (aged 89–90)
- Occupation: Inventor
- Known for: Invention of the Defibrator

Dr. Arne Asplund (1903 – 1993) was a Swedish inventor. He invented the Defibrator pulping refiner and the defibrator-method (also called Asplund-method) for pulping wooden chips in 1930s. His invention resulted in the company AB Defibrator in Stockholm which was merged with Sunds AB to form Sunds Defibrator in 1979.

Asplund was rewarded the Gold medal (Guldmedaljen) of the Royal Swedish Academy of Engineering Sciences (IVA) in 1947 for the invention and his further development of the defibrator-method for pulping wood and other fibre rich materials. He was later rewarded the Great gold medal (Stora guldmedaljen) from IVA in 1969 for his efforts on defibration technology. In 2014 Asplund was inducted to the Paper Industry International Hall of Fame.

== Arne Asplund Mechanical Pulping Award ==
The annual Arne Asplund Mechanical Pulping Award, was established in 1985 to commemorate Asplund’s contributions to the pulp and paper industry.
