= Medium-density fibreboard =

Engineered wood product

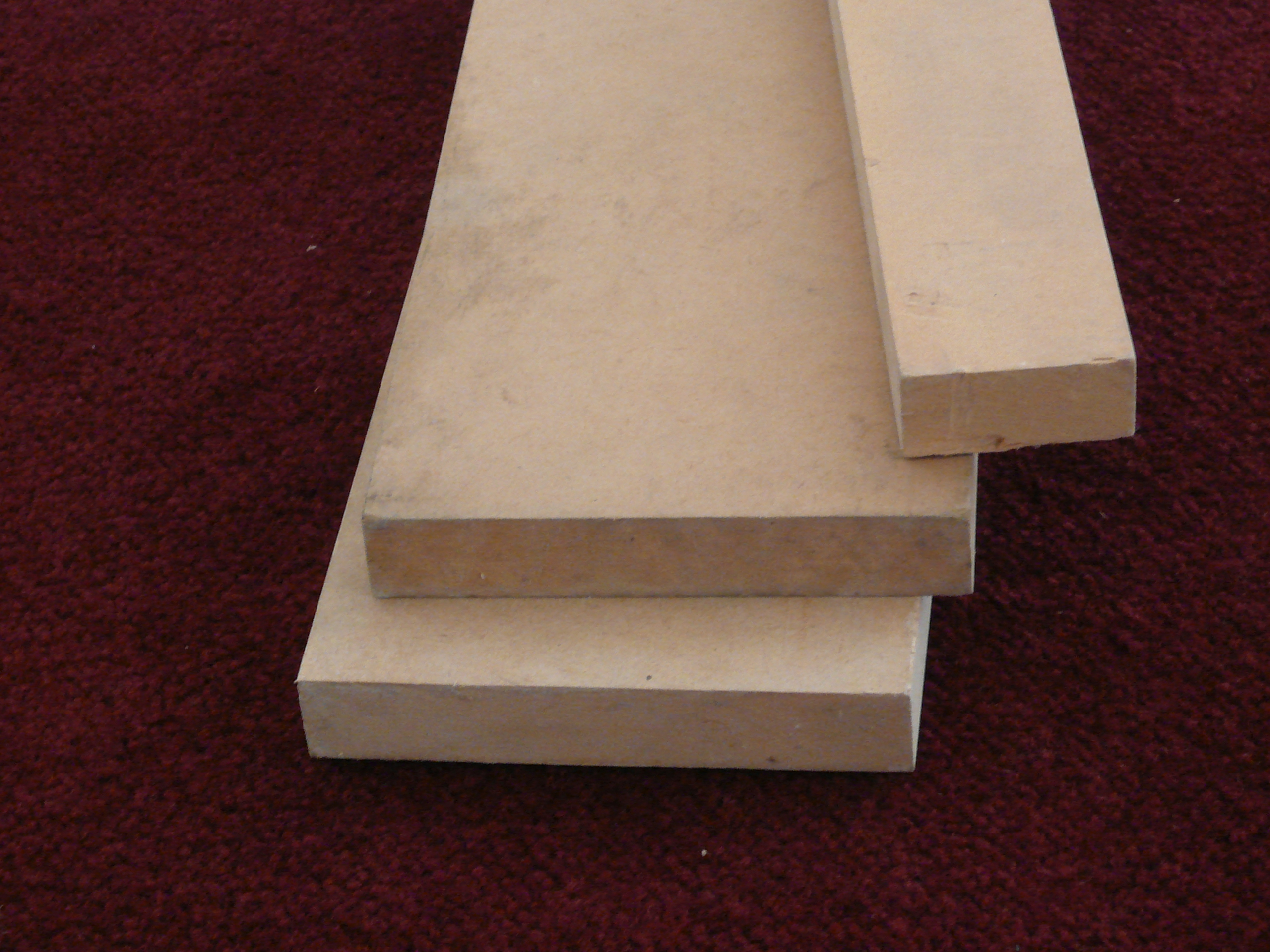
A sample of medium density fibreboard

Medium-density fibreboard (MDF) is an engineered wood product made by breaking down hardwood or softwood residuals into wood fibre, often in a defibrator, combining it with wax and a resin binder, and forming it into panels by applying high temperature and pressure. MDF is generally denser than plywood. It is made up of separated fibre but can be used as a building material similar in application to plywood. It is stronger and denser than particle board.

The name derives from the distinction in densities of fibreboard. Large-scale production of MDF began in the 1980s, in both North America and Europe.

Over time, the term "MDF" has become a generic name for any dry-process fibreboard.

== Physical properties ==
MDF is typically made up of 82% wood fibre, 9% urea-formaldehyde resin glue, 8% water, and 1% paraffin wax. The density is typically between 500 and 1,000 kg/m^{3} (31 and 62 lb/cu ft). The range of density and classification as light-, standard-, or high-density board is a misnomer and confusing. The density of the board, when evaluated in relation to the density of the fibre that goes into making the panel, is important. A thick MDF panel at a density of 700–720 kg/m^{3} (44–45 lb/cu ft) may be considered as high density in the case of softwood fibre panels, whereas a panel of the same density made of hardwood fibres is not regarded as so. The evolution of the various types of MDF has been driven by differing need for specific applications.

== Types ==
The different kinds of MDF (sometimes labeled by colour) are:

- Ultralight MDF plate (ULDF)
- Moisture-resistant board is typically green
- Fire retardant MDF is typically red or blue

In Europe, MDF is classified for use by the standard EN 622-5, such as load-bearing for general dry or humid conditions. The light and ultralight MDF are also classified by EN 622-5 for general (non-load-bearing) use.

EN 622 classification	Use
MDF	General purpose board for dry conditions
MDF.H	General purpose board for humid conditions
MDF.LA	Load-bearing boards for dry conditions
MDF.HLS	Load-bearing boards for humid conditions
MDF.RWH	Board for rigid underlays in roofs and walls

Although similar manufacturing processes are used in making all types of fibreboard, MDF has a typical density of 600–800 kg/m^{3} or 0.022–0.029 lb/in^{3}, in contrast to particle board (500–800 kg/m^{3}) and to high-density fibreboard (600–1,450 kg/m^{3}). In addition, MDF typically has an MOR of 40 MPa and an MOE of 3 GPa. Because it is easier to machine and has good weathering characteristics, it tends to replace particleboard in applications such as furniture, cabinet making, joinery, craft work and flooring.

== Manufacturing ==
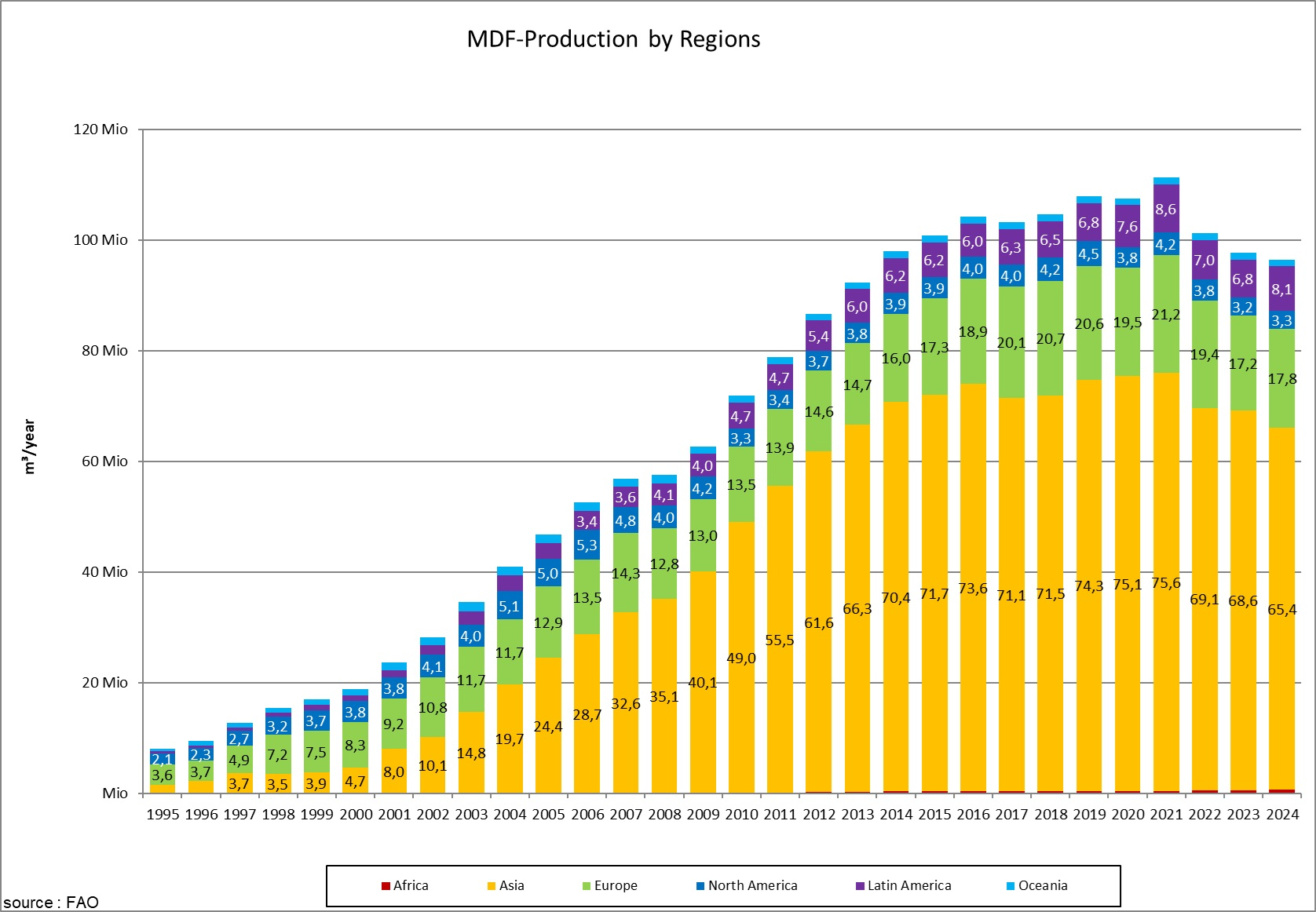
Development of the worldwide production of MDF by region 1995-2021. Africa Asia Europe North America Latin America Oceania

In Australia and New Zealand, the main species of tree used for MDF is plantation-grown radiata pine, but a variety of other products have also been used, including other woods, waste paper, and fibres. Where moisture resistance is desired, a proportion of eucalypt species may be used, making use of the endemic oil content of such trees.

=== Chip production ===
The trees are debarked after being cut. The bark can be sold for use in landscaping or used as biomass fuel in on-site furnaces. The debarked logs are sent to the MDF plant, where they go through the chipping process. A typical disk chipper contains four to 16 blades. Any resulting chips that are too large may be rechipped; undersized chips may be used as fuel. The chips are then washed and checked for defects. Chips may be stored in bulk, as a reserve for manufacturing.

=== Fibre production ===
Compared to other fibre boards, such as Masonite, MDF is characterised by the next part of the process, and how the fibres are processed as individual, but intact, fibres and vessels, manufactured through a dry process. The chips are then compacted into small plugs using a screw feeder, heated for 30–120 seconds to soften the lignin in the wood, then fed into a defibrator. A typical defibrator consists of two counter-rotating discs with grooves in their faces. Chips are fed into the centre and are fed outwards between the discs by centrifugal force. The decreasing size of the grooves gradually separates the fibres, aided by the softened lignin between them.

From the defibrator, the pulp enters a blowline, a distinctive part of the MDF process. This is an expanding circular pipeline, initially 40 mm in diameter, increasing to 1500 mm. Wax is injected in the first stage, which coats the fibres and is distributed evenly by the turbulent movement of the fibres. A urea-formaldehyde resin is then injected as the main bonding agent. The wax improves moisture resistance and the resin initially helps reduce clumping. The material dries quickly in the final heated expansion chamber of the blowline and expands into a fine, fluffy and lightweight fibre. The glue and the other components (hardener, dye, urea, and so on) can be injected into blowline even at a high pressure (100 bar, 10 MPa, 1,500 psi) and the drying process continues inside a long pipe to the exit cyclones, that is connected to the heating chamber. This fibre may be used immediately, or stored.

=== Sheet forming ===
Dry fibre is sucked into the top of a "pendistor", which evenly distributes fibre into a uniform mat below it, usually of 230–610 mm thickness. The mat is precompressed and either sent straight to a continuous hot press or cut into large sheets for a multiple-opening hot press. The hot press activates the bonding resin and sets the strength and density profile. The pressing cycle operates in stages, with the mat thickness being first compressed to around 1.5 times the finished board thickness, then compressed further in stages and held for a short period. This gives a board profile with zones of increased density, thus mechanical strength, near the two faces of the board and a less dense core.

After pressing, MDF is cooled in a star dryer or cooling carousel, trimmed, and sanded. In certain applications, boards are also laminated for extra strength.

The environmental impact of MDF has greatly improved over the years. Today, many MDF boards are made from a variety of materials. These include other woods, scrap, recycled paper, bamboo, carbon fibres and polymers, forest thinnings, and sawmill off-cuts. Some manufacturers have started testing and using nontoxic binders which would have a reduced environmental impact. Raw materials such as straw and bamboo are becoming popular fibres as they are fast-growing, renewable resources.

== Comparison with natural woods ==
MDF does not contain knots or rings, making it more uniform than natural woods during cutting and in service. However, MDF is not entirely isotropic since the fibres are pressed tightly together through the sheet. Typical MDF has a hard, flat, smooth surface that is suitable for applying a veneer, as it does not have a grain that will telegraph through the veneer as can happen with plywood. A so-called "premium" MDF is available that features more uniform density throughout the thickness of the panel.

MDF may be glued, doweled, or laminated. Typical fasteners are T-nuts and pan-head machine screws. Smooth-shank nails do not hold well, and neither do fine-pitch screws, especially in the edge. Special screws are available with a coarse thread pitch, but sheet-metal screws also work well. MDF is not susceptible to splitting when screws are installed in the face of the material, but due to the alignment of the wood fibres, may split when screws are installed in the edge of the board without pilot holes.

=== Advantages ===
- Denser than plywood and chipboard
- Consistent in strength and size
- Shapes well
- Stable dimensions (less expansion and contraction than natural wood)
- Takes paint well
- Takes wood glue well
- High screw pull-out strength in the face grain of the material
- Flexible

=== Disadvantages ===
- Low-grade MDF may swell and break when saturated with water
- May warp or expand in humid environments if not sealed
- May release formaldehyde, which is a known human carcinogen and may cause allergy, eye and lung irritation when cutting and sanding
- Dulls blades more quickly than many woods: Use of tungsten carbide-edged cutting tools is almost mandatory, as high-speed steel dulls too quickly.
- Though it does not have a grain in the plane of the board, it does have one into the board. Screwing into the edge of a board will generally cause it to split in a fashion similar to delaminating.

== Applications ==
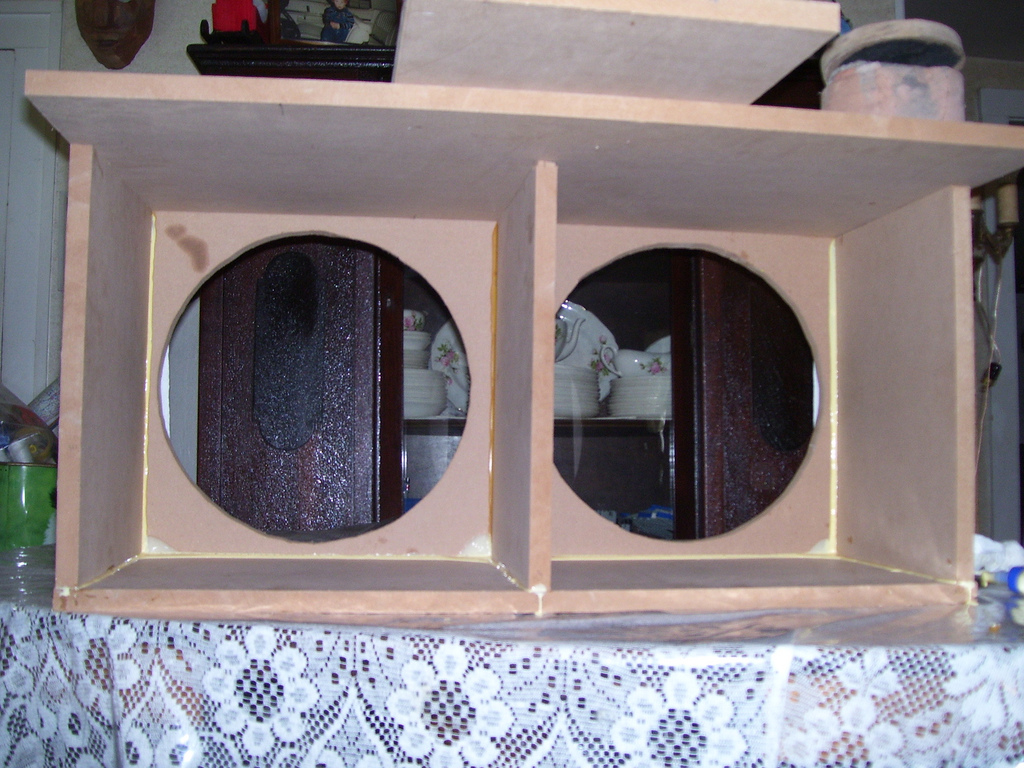
Loudspeaker enclosure being constructed out of MDF

MDF is often used in school projects because of its flexibility. Slatwall panels made from MDF are used in the shop fitting industry. MDF is primarily used for indoor applications due to its poor moisture resistance. It is available in raw form, or with a finely sanded surface, or with a decorative overlay.

MDF is also usable for furniture such as cabinets, because of its strong surface.

MDF's density makes it a useful material for the walls of pipe-organ chambers, allowing sound, particularly bass, to be reflected out of the chamber into the hall.

MDF is widely used for painted interior trim, including skirting (base) boards, architraves and window boards.

== Safety concerns ==
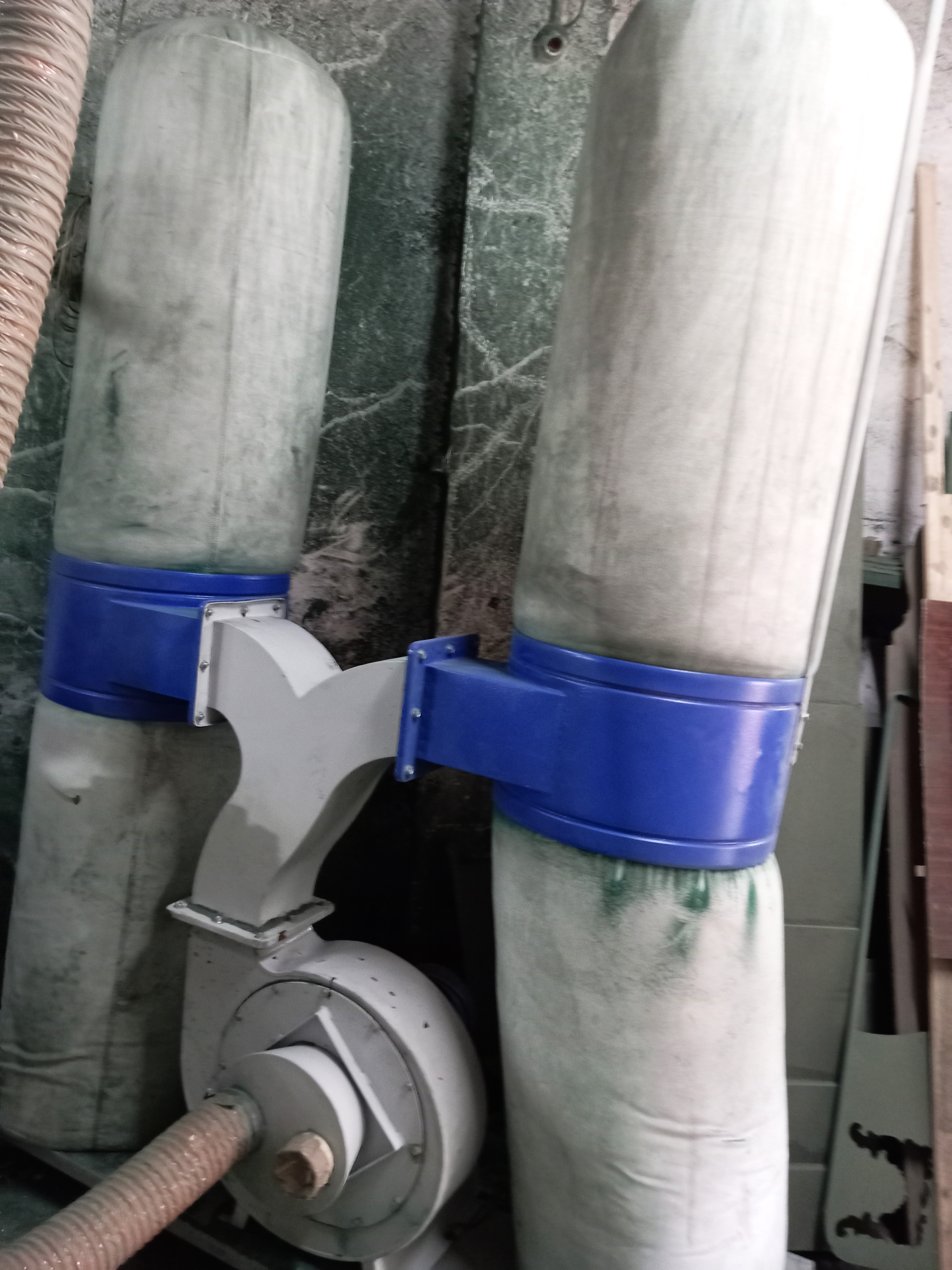
MDF dust collector

When MDF is cut, a large quantity of dust particulate is released into the air.

Formaldehyde resins are commonly used to bind together the fibres in MDF, and testing has consistently revealed that MDF products emit free formaldehyde and other volatile organic compounds that pose health risks at concentrations considered unsafe, for at least several months after manufacture. Urea-formaldehyde is always being slowly released from the edges and surface of MDF. When painting, coating all sides of the finished piece is a good practice to seal in the free formaldehyde. Wax and oil finishes may be used as finishes, but they are less effective at sealing in the free formaldehyde.

Whether these constant emissions of formaldehyde reach harmful levels in real-world environments is not fully determined. The primary concern is for the industries using formaldehyde. As far back as 1987, the United States Environmental Protection Agency classified it as a "probable human carcinogen", and after more studies, the World Health Organization's International Agency for Research on Cancer (IARC), in 1995, also classified it as a "probable human carcinogen". Further information and evaluation of all known data led the IARC to reclassify formaldehyde as a "known human carcinogen" associated with nasal sinus cancer and nasopharyngeal cancer, and possibly with leukaemia in June 2004.

According to International Composite Board Emission Standards, three European formaldehyde classes are used, E0, E1, and E2, based on the measurement of formaldehyde emission levels. For instance, E0 is classified as having less than 3 mg of formaldehyde out of every 100 g of the glue used in particleboard and plywood fabrication. E1 and E2 are classified as having 9 and 30 mg of formaldehyde per 100 g of glue, respectively. All around the world, variable certification and labeling schemes are there for such products that can be explicit to formaldehyde release, such as that of Californian Air Resources Board.

== Veneered MDF ==
Veneered MDF provides many of the advantages of MDF with a decorative wood veneer surface layer. In modern construction, spurred by the high costs of hardwoods, manufacturers have been using veneered MDF instead of hardwood. One common type uses oak veneer. Making veneered MDF is a complex procedure, which involves taking a slice of hardwood about 1–2 mm thick and then, through high pressure and stretching, wrapping it around a profiled MDF board. This is successful only when the MDF has a simple profile; if the thin wood layer is forced into more bends and angles, it will break as it dries.

== See also ==
- Oriented strand board
- Hardboard
- Solid wood
- Natural Fibre Board

== Sources ==
- Darbyshire, A. (2010). Mechanical Engineering. CRC Press. ISBN 978-1-136-43699-4.
