= Engineered bamboo =

Composite material made of bamboo

Engineered bamboo is a set of composite products produced from bamboo. It is designed to be a replacement for wood or engineered wood, but is used only when high load bearing strength is not required because building standards for this type of use have not been agreed by regulatory bodies. Engineered bamboo comes in several different forms, including bamboo scrimber and laminated bamboo, which has three times the structural capacity as normal timber and is defined and regulated by the ASTM International Standards.

Engineered bamboo has been used as paneling, vehicle beds, concrete formworks, lightweight building construction and even for shelters after the 2004 tsunami. In comparison to the woods that have been traditionally used, a number of benefits and drawbacks have been identified. Lower cost, especially when replacing wood that would otherwise have been imported, is a key advantage. Further benefits include greater hardness and shape retention, especially in high temperatures.

However, bamboo is not as resilient as most woods and will decay more rapidly than other woods if not treated with preservatives.

New building methods have had to be developed for engineered bamboo as its properties are sufficiently different, and make normal wood-working methods used with (non-engineered) bamboo unsuitable.

In order to overcome the typical loss of strength bamboo incurs when bending takes place post-harvest, an alternative method to overcome this has been developed.

Pre-harvest bending of the bamboo stems in zig-zags, allows the bamboo to later form a Warren truss.

Alexander Vittouris has proposed a much simpler 2D S-bend shape, which—after harvesting, and in sufficient quantities—could be assembled into a variety of 3D shapes. The arboriculture technique used to make both shapes is similar to tree shaping, and result in parts similar to woodworking knees.
