= InventWood =

American engineered wood company

InventWood is a materials science company that develops densified wood products under the trade name Superwood. The company was founded by materials engineer Liangbing Hu, and grew out of research led by Hu at the University of Maryland, College Park. The company is headquartered in Maryland. The commercial production of Superwood is scheduled to begin in mid-2025.

== Research background ==
In 2018, Hu's laboratory reported that partially removing lignin from natural wood and then compressing the remaining cellulose under heat produced a material roughly three times denser than the original timber and an order of magnitude stronger in bending and tension. The material was commercially named Superwood.

Superwood is produced in two steps. First, boards undergo "partial removal of lignin and hemicellulose from the natural wood via a boiling process in an aqueous mixture of NaOH and Na2SO3" while leaving the cellulose fibres largely intact. Second, the softened boards are pressed at moderate temperature and pressure, a stage that collapses cell walls, aligns cellulose nanofibrils and allows residual lignin to flow and re-bond, locking the structure in place. The hot-press stage is typically carried out at about 65 °C (150 °F) and reduces the board’s thickness by roughly a factor of five, further concentrating the cellulose network and raising the bulk density. The procedure works with many fast-growing softwoods and even with non-woody species such as bamboo.

Laboratory tests and independent assessments have reported tensile strength up to about 50 percent higher than structural-grade steel on an equal-cross-section basis. Because Superwood is significantly lighter, its strength-to-weight ratio is roughly ten times that of steel. Charpy impact tests show an order-of-magnitude gain in toughness compared with the parent wood, while compression and bending strengths also rise markedly. Superwood has attained a Class A fire rating and is resistant to insects, moisture, and rot when impregnated with a polymer. In longer-term ageing trials, the densified wood has also resisted fungal attack and shows slower aerobic decomposition than untreated wood when exposed to soil microorganisms.

== Fundraising and commercialisation ==
InventWood raised US$15 million in its Series A round led by climate-focused investors such as Grantham Foundation and Baruch Future Ventures, Builders Vision, and Muus Climate Partners. The company’s first commercial production line is scheduled to begin operation in mid-2025. The initial market focus is on cladding and facade panels, and prototype parts are being evaluated for lightweight vehicle interiors, aircraft cabin components, and furniture.

== See also ==
- Pulp and paper industry in the United States
