= Engineered wood =

Composite material made from wood

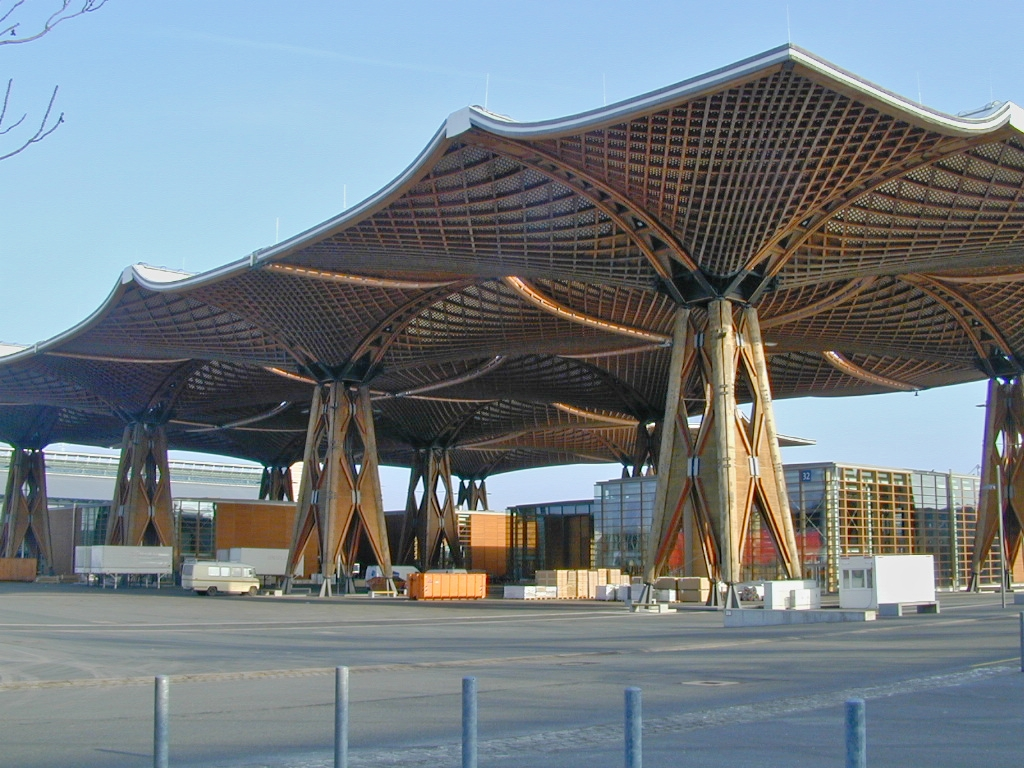
Large self-supporting wooden roof built for Expo 2000 in Hanover, Germany

Engineered wood, also called mass timber, composite wood, man-made wood, or manufactured board, includes a range of derivative wood products which are manufactured by binding or fixing the strands, particles, fibres, veneers, or boards of wood, together with adhesives, or other methods of fixation to form composite material. The panels vary in size but can range upwards of 64 by 8 feet (19.5 by 2.4 m) and in the case of cross-laminated timber (CLT) can be of any thickness from a few inches to 16 inches (410 mm) or more. These products are engineered to precise design specifications, which are tested to meet national or international standards and provide uniformity and predictability in their structural performance. Engineered wood products are used in a variety of applications, from home construction to commercial buildings to industrial products. The products can be used for joists and beams that replace steel in many building projects. The term mass timber describes a group of building materials that can replace concrete assemblies. Such wood-based products typically undergo machine grading in order to be evaluated and categorized for mechanical strength and suitability for specific applications.

Typically, engineered wood products are made from the same hardwoods and softwoods used to manufacture lumber. Sawmill scraps and other wood waste can be used for engineered wood composed of wood particles or fibers, but whole logs are usually used for veneers, such as plywood, medium-density fibreboard (MDF), or particle board. Some engineered wood products, like oriented strand board (OSB), can use trees from the poplar family, a common but non-structural species.

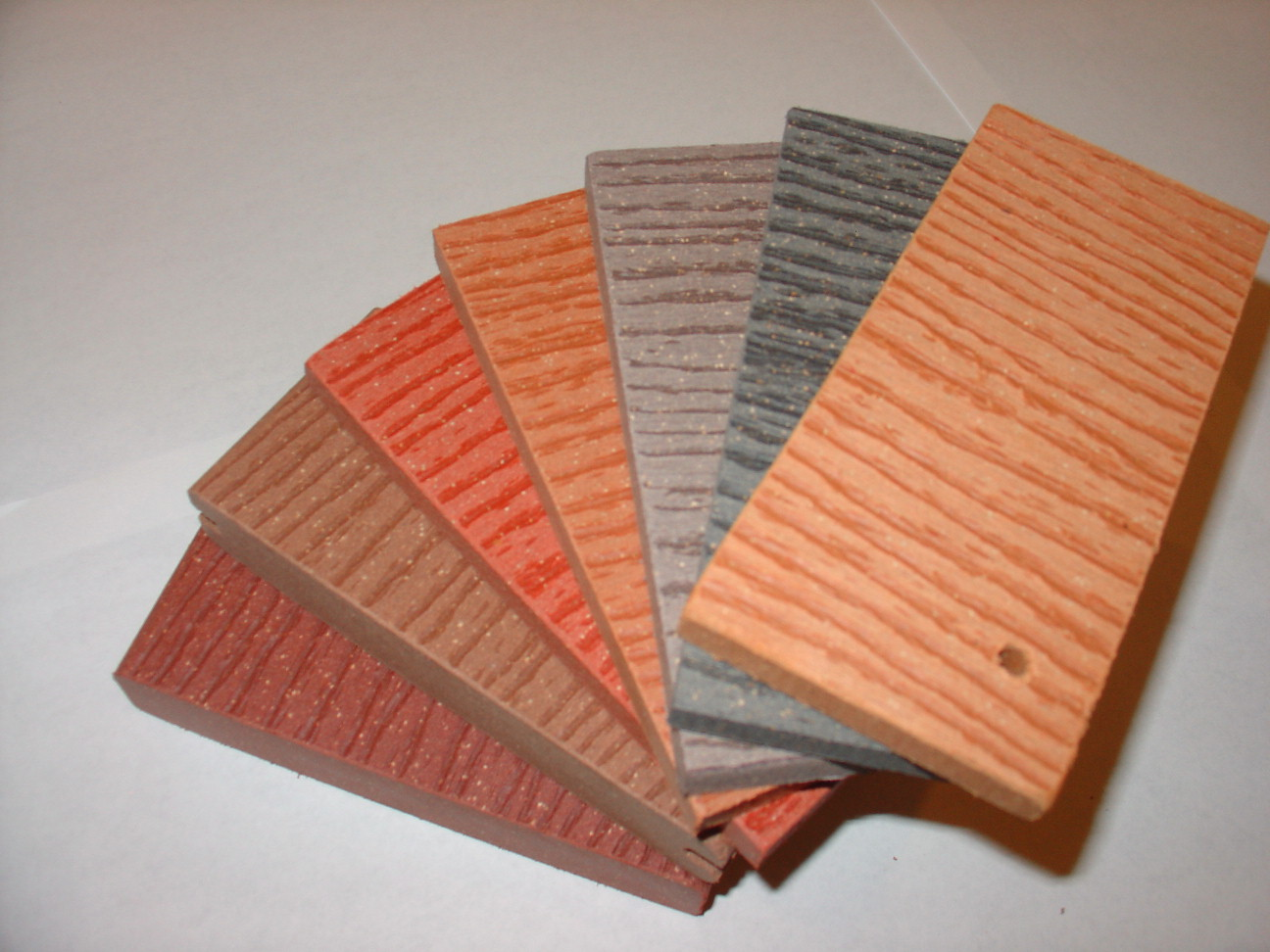
Wood–plastic composite, one kind of engineered wood

Alternatively, it is also possible to manufacture similar engineered bamboo from bamboo; and similar engineered cellulosic products from other lignin-containing materials such as rye straw, wheat straw, rice straw, hemp stalks, kenaf stalks, or sugar cane residue, in which case they contain no actual wood but rather vegetable fibers.

Flat-pack furniture is typically made out of artificial wood due to its low manufacturing costs and its low weight.

== Types of products ==
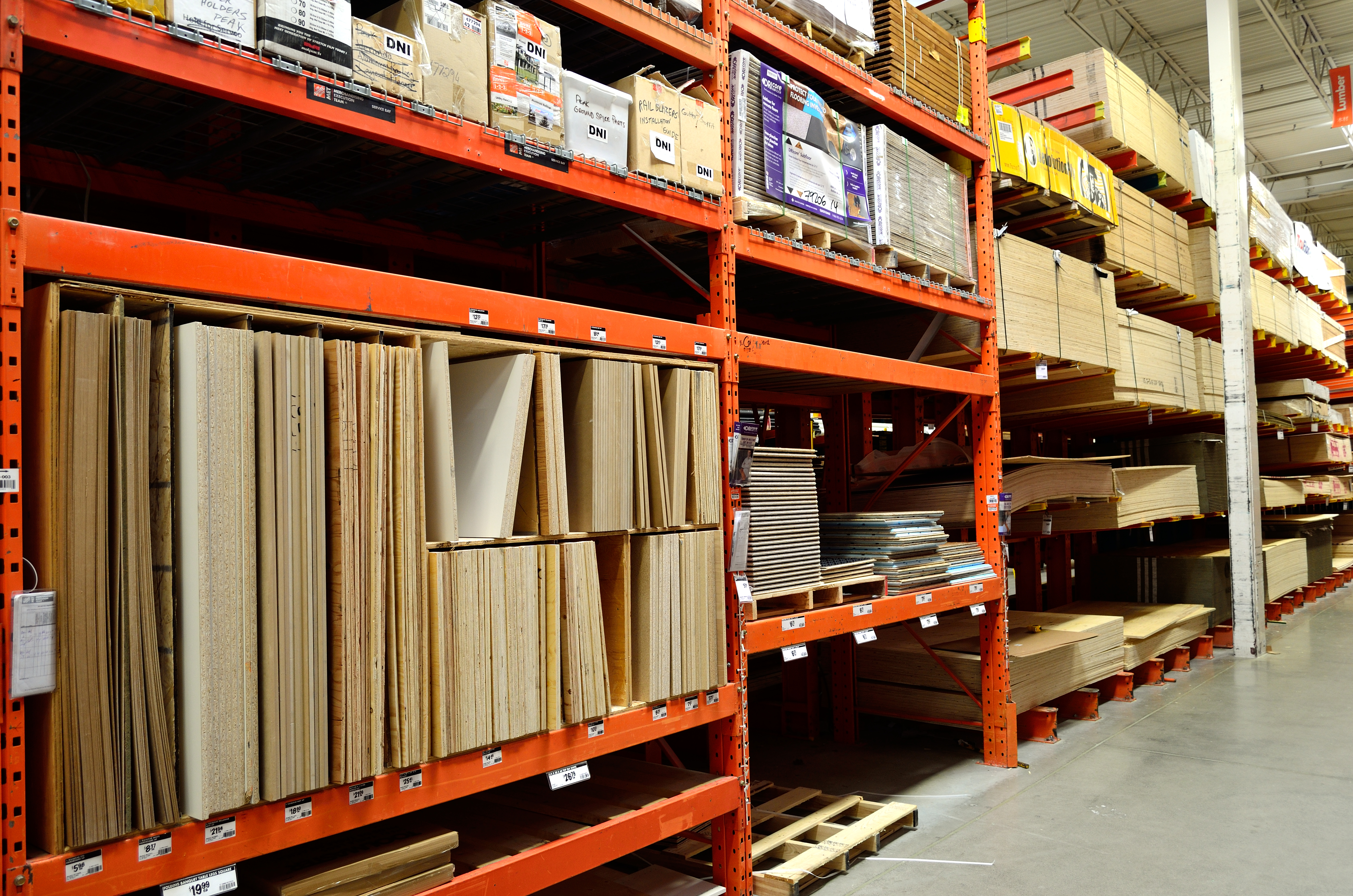
Engineered wood products in a Home Depot store

There are a wide variety of engineered wood products for both structural and non-structural applications. This list is not comprehensive, and is intended to help categorize and distinguish between different types of engineered wood.

=== Wood-based panels ===
Wood-based panels are made from fibres, flakes, particles, veneers, chips, sawdust, slabs, wood powder, strands, laminates or other wood derivate through a binding process with adhesives. Wood structural panels are a collection of flat panel products, used extensively in building construction for sheathing, decking, cabinetry and millwork, and furniture. Examples include plywood and oriented strand board (OSB). Non-structural wood-based panels are flat-panel products, used in non-structural construction applications and furniture. Non-structural panels are usually covered with paint, wood veneer, or resin paper in their final form. Examples include fiberboard and particle board.

==== Plywood ====
Plywood, a wood structural panel, is sometimes called the original engineered wood product. Plywood is manufactured from sheets of cross-laminated veneer and bonded under heat and pressure with durable, moisture-resistant adhesives. By alternating the grain direction of the veneers from layer to layer, or "cross-orienting", panel strength and stiffness in both directions are maximized. Other structural wood panels include oriented strand boards and structural composite panels.

==== Oriented strand board ====
Oriented strand board (OSB) is a wood structural panel manufactured from rectangular-shaped strands of wood that are oriented lengthwise and then arranged in layers, laid up into mats, and bonded together with moisture-resistant, heat-cured adhesives. The individual layers can be cross-oriented to provide strength and stiffness to the panel. Similar to plywood, most OSB panels are delivered with more strength in one direction. The wood strands in the outermost layer on each side of the board are normally aligned into the strongest direction of the board. Arrows on the product will often identify the strongest direction of the board (the height, or longest dimension, in most cases). Produced in huge, continuous mats, OSB is a solid panel product of consistent quality with no laps, gaps, or voids. OSB is delivered in various dimensions, strengths, and levels of water resistance.

OSB and plywood are often used interchangeably in building construction.

==== Fibreboard ====
Medium-density fibreboard (MDF) and high-density fibreboard (hardboard or HDF) are made by breaking down hardwood or softwood residuals into wood fibers, combining them with wax and a resin binder, and forming panels by applying high temperature and pressure. MDF is used in non-structural applications.

==== Particle board ====
Particle board is manufactured from wood chips, sawmill shavings, or even sawdust, and a synthetic resin or another suitable binder, which is pressed and extruded. Research published in 2017 showed that durable particle board can be produced from agricultural waste products, such as rice husk or guinea corn husk. Particleboard is cheaper, denser, and more uniform than conventional wood and plywood and is substituted for them when the cost is more important than strength and appearance. A major disadvantage of particleboard is that it is very prone to expansion and discoloration due to moisture, particularly when it is not covered with paint or another sealer. Particle board is used in non-structural applications.

=== Structural composite lumber ===
Structural composite lumber (SCL) is a class of materials made with layers of veneers, strands, or flakes bonded with adhesives. Unlike wood structural panels, structural composite lumber products generally have all grain fibers oriented in the same direction. The SCL family of engineered wood products are commonly used in the same structural applications as conventional sawn lumber and timber, including rafters, headers, beams, joists, rim boards, studs, and columns. SCL products have higher dimensional stability and increased strength compared to conventional lumber products.

==== Laminated veneer ====
Laminated veneer lumber (LVL) is produced by bonding thin wood veneers together in a large billet, similar to plywood. The grain of all veneers in the LVL billet is parallel to the long direction (unlike plywood). The resulting product features enhanced mechanical properties and dimensional stability that offer a broader range in product width, depth, and length than conventional lumber.

==== Parallel-strand ====
Parallel-strand lumber (PSL) consists of long veneer strands laid in parallel formation and bonded together with an adhesive to form the finished structural section. The length-to-thickness ratio of strands in PSL is about 300. A strong, consistent material, it has a high load-carrying ability and is resistant to seasoning stresses so it is well suited for use as beams and columns for post and beam construction, and for beams, headers, and lintels for light framing construction.

==== Laminated strand ====
Laminated strand lumber (LSL) and oriented strand lumber (OSL) are manufactured from flaked wood strands that have a high length-to-thickness ratio. Combined with an adhesive, the strands are oriented and formed into a large mat or billet and pressed. LSL and OSL offer good fastener-holding strength and mechanical-connector performance and are commonly used in a variety of applications, such as beams, headers, studs, rim boards, and millwork components. LSL is manufactured from relatively short strands—typically about 1 foot (0.30 m) long—compared to the 2-to-8-foot-long (0.61–2.44 m) strands used in PSL. The length-to-thickness ratio of strands is about 150 for LSL and 75 for OSL.

=== I-joists ===
I-joists are "Ɪ"-shaped structural members designed for use in floor and roof construction. An I-joist consists of top and bottom flanges of various widths united with webs of various depths. The flanges resist common bending stresses, and the web provides shear performance. I-joists are designed to carry heavy loads over long distances while using less lumber than a dimensional solid wood joist of a size necessary to do the same task. As of 2004, approximately 81% of all wood light framed floors were framed using I-joists.

=== Mass timber ===
Mass timber, also known as engineered timber, is a class of large structural wood components for building construction. Mass timber components are made of lumber or veneers bonded with adhesives or mechanical fasteners. Certain types of mass timber, such as nail-laminated timber and glue-laminated timber, have existed for over a hundred years. Mass timber enjoyed increasing popularity from 2012 onward, due to growing concern around the sustainability of building materials, and interest in prefabrication, off site construction, and modularization, for which mass timber is well suited. The various types of mass timber share the advantage of faster construction times as the components are manufactured off-site, and pre-finished to exact dimensions for simple on-site fastening. Mass timber has been shown to have structural properties competitive with steel and concrete, opening the possibility to build large, tall buildings out of wood. Extensive testing has demonstrated the natural fire resistance properties of mass timber – primarily due the creation of a char layer around a column or beam which prevents fire from reaching the inner layers of wood. In recognition of the proven structural and fire performance of mass timber, the International Building Code, a model code that forms the basis of many North American building codes, adopted new provisions in the 2021 code cycle that permit mass timber to be used in high-rise construction up to 18 stories.

==== Cross-laminated timber ====
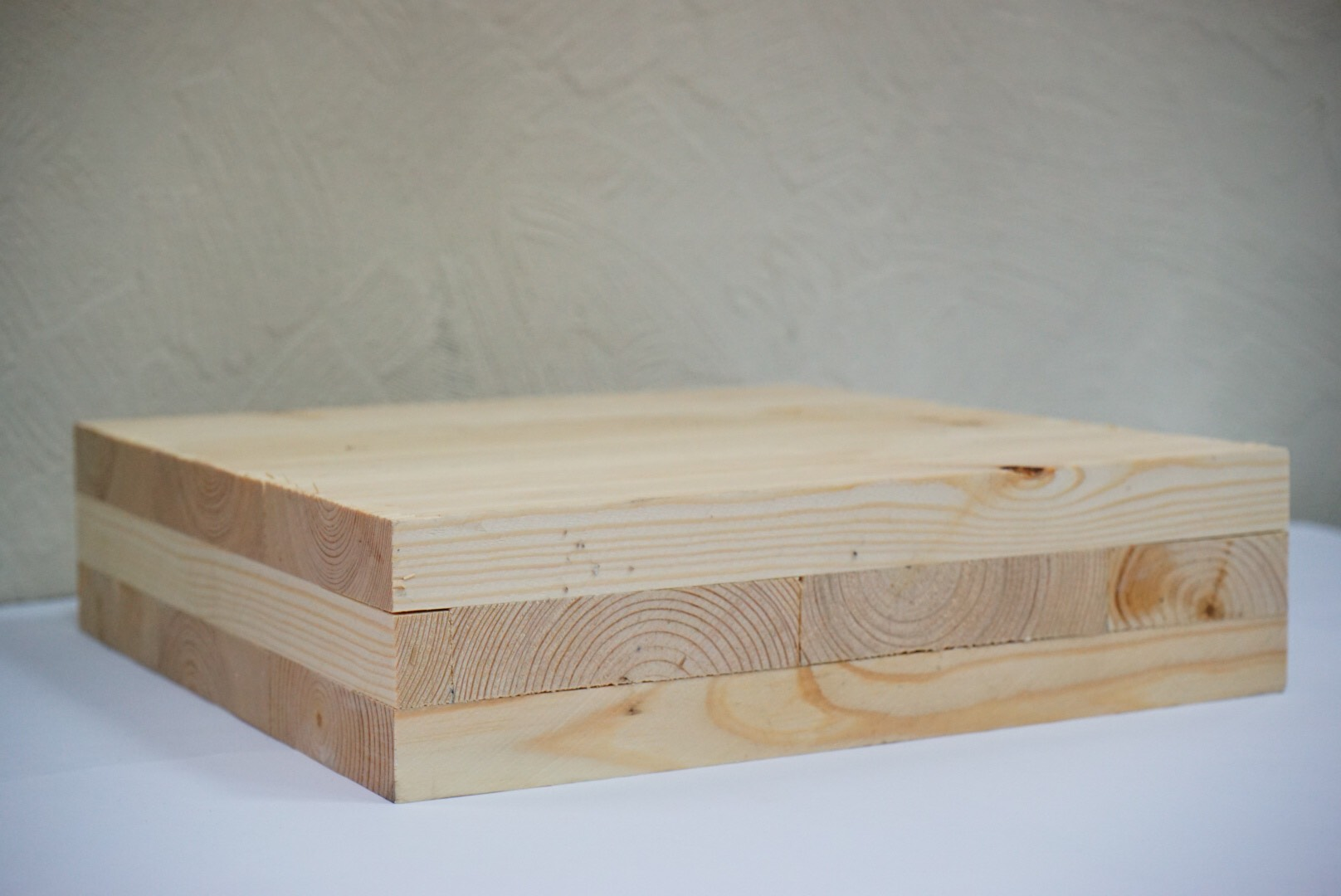
CLT-plate with three layers made from spruce

Cross-laminated timber (CLT) is a versatile multi-layered panel made of lumber. Each layer of boards is placed perpendicular to adjacent layers for increased rigidity and strength. It is relatively new and gaining popularity within the construction industry as it can be used for long spans and all assemblies, e.g. floors, walls, or roofs.

==== Glued laminated timber ====
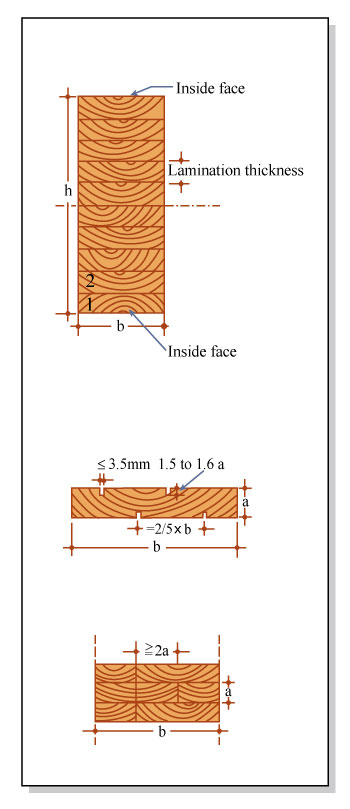
Diagram of glued laminated timber (glulam).

Glued laminated timber (glulam) is composed of several layers of dimensional timber glued together with moisture-resistant adhesives, creating a large, strong, structural member that can be used as vertical columns or horizontal beams. Glulam can also be produced in curved shapes, offering extensive design flexibility.

==== Dowel-laminated timber ====
Dowel laminated timber (DLT), sometimes referred to as Brettstapel, is a wood-on-wood timber. The biggest benefit of this method is that no glue or metal is needed, thus eliminating VOCs (such as formaldehyde) associated with wood adhesives used in most other engineered timbers.

Similar to CLT, DLT uses a cross laminated pattern with softwoods, but instead of wood adhesives to fix lumbers in place, holes are drilled vertically or in a 45° angle, and 15-20mm dowels made of dry hardwood or densified wood (such as thermal-compressed) are placed between the lumbers.

As the hardwood dowel absorbs moisture from the softwood to reach an equilibrium moisture content, it expands into the surrounding wood, creating a connection and 'locking' them together through friction. The dowels can be dried (such as through a kiln) prior to fitting, to maximize their expansion.

==== Nail-laminated timber ====
Nail laminated timber (NLT) is a mass timber product that consists of parallel boards fastened with nails. It can be used to create floors, roofs, walls, and elevator shafts within a building. It is one of the oldest types of mass timber, being used in warehouse construction during the Industrial Revolution. Like DLT, no chemical adhesives are used, and wood fibers are oriented in the same direction.

=== Engineered wood flooring ===
Engineered wood flooring is a type of flooring product, similar to hardwood flooring, made of layers of wood or wood-based composite laminated together. The floor boards are usually milled with a tongue-and-groove profile on the edges for consistent joinery between boards.

==== Lamella ====
The lamella is the face layer of the wood that is visible when installed. Typically, it is a sawn piece of timber. The timber can be cut in three different styles: flat-sawn, quarter-sawn, and rift-sawn.

==== Types of core/substrate ====
1. Wood ply construction ("sandwich core"): Uses multiple thin plies of wood adhered together. The wood grain of each ply runs perpendicular to the ply below it. Stability is attained from using thin layers of wood that have little to no reaction to climatic change. The wood is further stabilized due to equal pressure being exerted lengthwise and widthwise from the plies running perpendicular to each other.
2. Finger core construction: Finger core engineered wood floors are made of small pieces of milled timber that run perpendicular to the top layer (lamella) of wood. They can be 2-ply or 3-ply, depending on their intended use. If it is three-ply, the third ply is often plywood that runs parallel to the lamella. Stability is gained through the grains running perpendicular to each other, and the expansion and contraction of wood are reduced and relegated to the middle ply, stopping the floor from gapping or cupping.
3. Fibreboard: The core is made up of medium or high-density fibreboard. Floors with a fibreboard core are hygroscopic and must never be exposed to large amounts of water or very high humidity - the expansion caused by absorbing water combined with the density of the fibreboard, will cause it to lose its form. Fibreboard is less expensive than timber and can emit higher levels of harmful gases due to its relatively high adhesive content.
4. An engineered flooring construction that is popular in parts of Europe is the hardwood lamella, softwood core laid perpendicular to the lamella, and a final backing layer of the same noble wood used for the lamella. Other noble hardwoods are sometimes used for the back layer but must be compatible. This is thought by many to be the most stable of engineered floors.

=== Other types of modified wood ===
Techniques have been introduced in the field of engineered wood including transformation of natural wood in laboratories through chemical and/or physical treatments to achieve tailored mechanical, optical, thermal, and conduction properties.

==== Densified wood ====
Densified wood can be made by using a mechanical hot press to compress wood fibers, sometimes in combination with chemical modification of the wood. These processes have been shown to increase the density by a factor of three. This increase in density is expected to enhance the strength and stiffness of the wood by a proportional amount. Studies published in 2018 combined chemical processes with traditional mechanical hot press methods. These chemical processes break down lignin and hemicellulose that are found naturally in the wood. Following dissolution, the cellulose strands that remain are mechanically hot compressed. Compared to the three-fold increase in strength observed from hot pressing alone, chemically processed wood has been shown to yield an 11-fold improvement. This extra strength comes from hydrogen bonds formed between the aligned cellulose nanofibers.

The densified wood possessed mechanical strength comparable to steel used in construction, expanding its potential applications beyond those of traditional wood. It also has a lower environmental footprint than steel, requiring significantly less carbon dioxide to produce. A commercial version of densified wood, branded as SuperWood, is being developed by InventWood, a startup based in Maryland. The company plans to begin limited production in 2025, focusing initially on building facade applications.

Synthetic resin densified wood is resin-impregnated densified wood, also known as compreg. Usually phenolic resin is used as impregnation resin to impregnate and laminate plywood layers. Sometimes layers are not impregnated before lamination. It is also possible to impregnate wood chips to produce molded pressed wood components.

==== Delignified wood ====
Removing lignin from wood has several other applications, apart from providing structural advantages. Delignification alters the mechanical, thermal, optical, fluidic and ionic properties and functions of the natural wood and is an effective approach to regulating its thermal properties, as it removes the thermally conductive lignin component, while generating a large number of nanopores in the cell walls which help reduce temperature change. Delignified wood reflects most incident light and appears white in color. White wood (also known as nanowood) has high reflection haze, as well as high emissivity in the infrared wavelengths. These two characteristics generate a passive radiative cooling effect, with an average cooling power of 53 W⋅m^{−2} over a 24-hour period, meaning that this wood does not "absorb" heat and therefore only emits the heat embedded in it. Moreover, white wood not only possesses a lower thermal conductivity than natural wood, and it has better thermal performance than most commercially available insulating materials. The modification of the mesoporous structure of the wood is responsible for the changes in wood performance.

White wood can also be put through a compression process, similar to the process mentioned for densified wood, which increases its mechanical performance compared to natural wood (8.7 times higher in tensile strength and 10 times higher in toughness). The thermal and structural advantages of nanowood make it an attractive material for energy-efficient building construction. However, the changes made in the wood's structural properties, like the increase in structural porosity and the partially isolated cellulose nanofibrils, damage the material's mechanical robustness. To deal with this issue, several strategies have been proposed, with one being to further densify the structure, and another to use cross-linking. Other suggestions include hybridizing natural wood with other organic particles and polymers to enhance its thermal insulation performance.

==== Moldable wood ====
Using similar chemical modification techniques to chemically densified wood, wood can be made extremely moldable using a combination of delignification and water shock treatment. This is an emerging technology and is not yet used in industrial processes. However, initial tests show promising advantages in improved mechanical properties, with the molded wood exhibiting strength comparable to some metal alloys.

==== Transparent wood composites ====
Transparent wood composites are new materials, as of 2020 are made at the laboratory scale, that combines transparency and stiffness via a chemical process that replaces light-absorbing compounds, such as lignin, with a transparent polymer.

== Environmental benefits ==
New construction is in high demand due to growing worldwide population. However, the main materials used in new construction are currently steel and concrete. The manufacturing of these materials creates comparatively high emissions of carbon dioxide (CO_{2}) into the atmosphere. Engineered wood has the potential to reduce carbon emissions if it replaces steel and/or concrete in the construction of buildings.

In 2014, steel and cement production accounted for about 1320 megatonnes (Mt) CO_{2} and 1740 Mt CO_{2} respectively, which made up about 9% of global CO_{2} emissions that year. In a study that did not take the carbon sequestration potential of engineered wood into account, it was found that roughly 50 Mt CO_{2}e (carbon dioxide equivalent) could be eliminated by 2050 with the full uptake of a hybrid construction system utilizing engineered wood and steel. When considering the added effects that carbon sequestration can have over the lifetime of the material, the emissions reductions of engineered wood is even more substantial, as laminated wood that is not incinerated at the end of its lifecycle absorbs around 582 kg of CO_{2}/m^{3}, while reinforced concrete emits 458 kg CO_{2}/m^{3} and steel 12.087 kg CO_{2}/m^{3}.

There is not a strong consensus for measuring the carbon sequestration potential of wood. In life-cycle assessment, sequestered carbon is sometimes called biogenic carbon. ISO 21930, a standard that governs life cycle assessment, requires the biogenic carbon from a wood product can only be included as a negative input (i.e. carbon sequestration) when the wood product originated in a sustainably managed forest. This generally means that wood needs to be FSC or SFI-certified to qualify as carbon sequestering.

== Advantages ==
Engineered wood products are used in a variety of ways, often in applications similar to solid wood products:

- Mass timber (MT) is lightweight allowing the material to be easily handled, manufactured, and transported. This contributes to it being cost effective and easy to use on site.
- MT offers greater strength and stiffness (based on its strength to weight ratio), increased dimensional stability, and uniformity in structures than solid wood.
- When compared to steel/concrete, MT built buildings use up to 15% less energy because of the reduced energy needed to create these wood products.
- MT buildings on average save 20-25% in time when compared to conventional steel/concrete buildings and 4.2% on capital cost.
- MT products sequester carbon and store it within themselves over their lifespan. Using this instead of concrete and steel in buildings will reduce the embodied emissions in buildings.
- Using MT has an estimated savings of around 20% in embodied carbon when compared to steel or concrete. This is because MT is a lot lighter when compared to these two materials, so it is less intensive for the machinery to transport both to site and once delivered.
- MT products can provide high levels of airtightness and low coefficients of thermal conductivity meaning that the air inside cannot escape, and heat is not lost easily.
- MT built buildings perform very well in seismic events because they are roughly half the mass and half the stiffness when compared to reinforced concrete buildings. Reduced stiffness allows MT buildings to be ductile and resist lateral distortion without compromising the structural integrity of the building.
- MT is fire resistant to an extent. Although it is considered a combustible material, MT burns slowly and in a predictable manner. When burned, a charred layer forms on the outside that protects the inner layers of the material. However, if the charred layer comes off, the inner layers will be exposed which can compromise the integrity of the material.

Advantages by product type:

- CLT: Offers high dimensional stability, high strength and stiffness and is easy to manufacture.
- Glulam: Offers high strength and stiffness, is structurally efficient, and can be manufactured into complex shapes.
- NLT: Does not require any specialized equipment to manufacture, is cost effective, and easy to handle.
- DLT: Offers high dimensional stability, is easy and safe to manufacture, and no metal fasteners or adhesive is required.
- SCL: Is able to withstand greater loads compared to solid timber and is not prone to shrinking, splitting or warping.

Engineered wood products may be preferred over solid wood in some applications due to certain comparative advantages:

- Because engineered wood is man-made, it can be designed to meet application-specific performance requirements. Required shapes and dimension do not drive source tree requirements (length or width of the tree)
- Engineered wood products are versatile and available in a wide variety of thicknesses, sizes, grades, and exposure durability classifications, making the products ideal for use in unlimited construction, industrial, and home project application.
- Engineered wood products are designed and manufactured to maximize the natural strength and stiffness characteristics of wood. The products are very stable and some offer greater structural strength than typical wood building materials.
- Glued laminated timber (glulam) has greater strength and stiffness than comparable dimensional lumber and, pound for pound, is stronger than steel.
- Engineered wood panels are easy to work with using ordinary tools and basic skills. They can be cut, drilled, routed, jointed, glued, and fastened. Plywood can be bent to form curved surfaces without loss of strength. Large panel sizes speeds up construction by reducing the number of pieces that need to be handled and installed.
- Engineered wood products are a more efficient use of wood as they can be made from wood that has defects, underutilized species or smaller pieces of wood which also enables the use of smaller trees
- Wooden trusses are competitive in many roof and floor applications, and their high strength-to-weight ratios permit long spans offering flexibility in floor layouts.
- Sustainable design advocates recommend using engineered wood, which can be produced from relatively small trees, rather than large pieces of solid dimensional lumber, which requires cutting a large tree.

== Disadvantages ==
- Like solid wood, when exposed to high moisture conditions or termites, biodeteriorations and/or fungi decay will occur which reduces the structural integrity and durability of the wood product; essentially the wood will start to rot.
- Potential widespread deforestation without a sustainable forestry management plan.
- MT buildings are susceptible to wind driven oscillation because of the relative flexibility of the MT material which may cause discomfort to people in the building.

Disadvantages by product type:

- CLT and Glulam: More costly than solid wood.
- NLT: Labor-intensive to make with potential for human error.
- DLT: Limited panel sizing and thickness.
- SCL: Limited panel sizing and thickness; more suitable for low rise buildings.

When compared to solid wood the following disadvantages are prevalent:

- They require more primary energy for their manufacture than solid lumber.
- The adhesives used in some products may cause harmful emissions. A concern with some resins is the release of formaldehyde in the finished product, often seen with urea-formaldehyde bonded products.

== Properties ==
Plywood and OSB typically have a density of 560–640 kg/m^{3} (35–40 lb/cu ft). For example, 9.5 mm (3/8 in) plywood sheathing or OSB sheathing typically has a surface density of 4.9–5.9 kg/m^{2} (1–1.2 lb/ft^{2}). Many other engineered woods have densities much higher than OSB.

== Adhesives ==
The types of adhesives used in engineered wood include:

- Urea-formaldehyde resins (UF): most common, cheapest, and not waterproof.
- Phenol formaldehyde resins (PF): yellow/brown, and commonly used for exterior exposure products.
- Melamine-formaldehyde resins (MF): white, heat, and water-resistant, and often used in exposed surfaces in more costly designs.
- Polymeric methylene diphenyl diisocyanate (pMDI) or polyurethane (PU) resins: expensive, generally waterproof, and does not contain formaldehyde, notoriously more difficult to release from platens and engineered wood presses.

A more inclusive term is structural composites. For example, fiber cement siding is made of cement and wood fiber, while cement board is a low-density cement panel, often with added resin, faced with fiberglass mesh.

=== Health concerns ===
While formaldehyde is an essential ingredient of cellular metabolism in mammals, studies have linked prolonged inhalation of formaldehyde gases to cancer. Engineered wood composites have been found to emit potentially harmful amounts of formaldehyde gas in two ways: unreacted free formaldehyde and the chemical decomposition of resin adhesives. When excessive amounts of formaldehyde are added to a process, the surplus will not have any additive to bond with and may seep from the wood product over time. Cheap urea-formaldehyde (UF) adhesives are largely responsible for degraded resin emissions. Moisture degrades the weak UF molecules, resulting in potentially harmful formaldehyde emissions. McLube offers release agents and platen sealers designed for those manufacturers who use reduced-formaldehyde UF and melamine-formaldehyde adhesives. Many OSB and plywood manufacturers use phenol-formaldehyde (PF) because phenol is a much more effective additive. Phenol forms a water-resistant bond with formaldehyde that will not degrade in moist environments. PF resins have not been found to pose significant health risks due to formaldehyde emissions. While PF is an excellent adhesive, the engineered wood industry has started to shift toward polyurethane binders like pMDI to achieve even greater water resistance, strength, and process efficiency. pMDIs are also used extensively in the production of rigid polyurethane foams and insulators for refrigeration. pMDIs outperform other resin adhesives, but they are notoriously difficult to release and cause buildup on tooling surfaces.

=== Mechanical fasteners ===
Some engineered wood products, such as DLT, NLT, and some brands of CLT, can be assembled without the use of adhesives using mechanical fasteners or joinery. These can range from profiled interlocking jointed boards, proprietary metal fixings, nails or timber dowels.

== Building codes and standards ==
Throughout the years mass timber was used in buildings, codes were added to and adopted by the International Building Code (IBC) to create standards for them for the proper use and handling. For example, in 2015, CLT was incorporated into the IBC. The 2021 IBC added building types IV-A, IV-B, and IV-C, which they allow mass timber to be used in buildings up to 18, 12, and nine stories respectively.

The following technical performance standards are related to engineered wood products:

- EN 300 - Oriented Strand Boards (OSB) — Definitions, classification, and specifications
- EN 309 - Particleboards — Definition and classification
- EN 338 - Structural timber - Strength classes
- EN 386 - Glued laminated timber — performance requirements and minimum production requirements
- EN 313-1 - Plywood — Classification and terminology Part 1: Classification
- EN 313-2 - Plywood — Classification and terminology Part 2: Terminology
- EN 314-1 - Plywood — Bonding quality — Part 1: Test methods
- EN 314-2 - Plywood — Bonding quality — Part 2: Requirements
- EN 315 - Plywood — Tolerances for dimensions
- EN 387 - Glued laminated timber — large finger joints - performance requirements and minimum production requirements
- EN 390 - Glued laminated timber — sizes - permissible deviations
- EN 391 - Glued laminated timber — shear test of glue lines
- EN 392 - Glued laminated timber — Shear test of glue lines
- EN 408 - Timber structures — Structural timber and glued laminated timber — Determination of some physical and mechanical properties
- EN 622-1 - Fibreboards — Specifications — Part 1: General requirements
- EN 622-2 - Fibreboards — Specifications — Part 2: Requirements for hardboards
- EN 622-3 - Fibreboards — Specifications — Part 3: Requirements for medium boards
- EN 622-4 - Fibreboards — Specifications — Part 4: Requirements for soft boards
- EN 622-5 - Fibreboards — Specifications — Part 5: Requirements for dry process boards (MDF)
- EN 1193 - Timber structures — Structural timber and glued laminated timber - Determination of shear strength and mechanical properties perpendicular to the grain
- EN 1194 - Timber structures — Glued laminated timber - Strength classes and determination of characteristic values
- EN 1995-1-1 - Eurocode 5: Design of timber structures — Part 1-1: General — Common rules and rules for buildings
- EN 12369-1 - Wood-based panels — Characteristic values for structural design — Part 1: OSB, particleboards, and fibreboards
- EN 12369-2 - Wood-based panels — Characteristic values for structural design — Part 2: Plywood
- EN 12369-3 - Wood-based panels — Characteristic values for structural design — Part 3: Solid wood panels
- EN 14080 - Timber structures — Glued laminated timber — Requirements
- EN 14081-1 - Timber structures - Strength graded structural timber with rectangular cross-section - Part 1: General requirements

The following product category rules can be used to create environmental product declarations for engineered wood products:

- EN 15804 - Sustainability of construction works - Environmental product declarations - Core rules for the product category of construction products
- EN 16485 - Round and sawn timber - Environmental Product Declarations - Product category rules for wood and wood-based products for use in construction (complementary-PCR to EN 15804)
- ISO 21930 - Sustainability in buildings and civil engineering works - Core rules for environmental product declarations of construction products and services

== Examples of mass timber structures ==
=== Plyscrapers ===
From 1942 to 1943, 17 airship hangars in the United States were built of wood; during war time, no steel was available for their construction.

Plyscrapers are skyscrapers that are either partially made of wood or entirely made of wood. Around the world, many different plyscrapers have been built, including the Ascent MKE building, Mjostarnet in Norway, and the Stadthaus building.

The Ascent MKE building was built in 2022 in Milwaukee, Wisconsin, and is the tallest high-rise building using different mass timber components in combination with some steel and concrete. This plyscraper is 87 meters tall and has 25 stories.

The Stadthaus building is a residential building built in 2009 in Hackney, London. It has 9 stories reaching 30 meters tall. It uses CLT panels as load-bearing walls and floor 'slabs'.

The Black & White Building is an office building topped out in 2023 in Shoreditch, London. It has 6 stories reaching 17.8 meters tall. It uses CLT panels, glulam curtain walling, and LVL columns and beams.

As of 2022, over 84 mass timber buildings at least eight stories tall were in construction or completed worldwide, with numerous other projects in the planning stages. Its environmental benefits and distinctive appearance drive the growing interest in mass timber construction.

=== Bridges ===
The Mistissini Bridge built in Quebec, Canada, in 2014 is a 160-meter-long bridge that features both glulam beams and CLT panels. The bridge was designed to cross over the Uupaachikus Pass.

The Placer River Pedestrian Bridge built in Alaska, United States, in 2013. It spans 85 metres (280 ft) long and is located in the Chugach National Forest. This bridge features glulam as it was used create the trusses.

=== Parking structures ===
The Glenwood CLT Parking Garage in Springfield, Oregon, is going to be a 19,100-square-metre (206,000 sq ft) garage that features CLT. It will be 4 stories tall and hold 360 parking spaces. The parking garage however is under construction as of December 2022, and the year of completion is not yet known.

== See also ==
- Green building and wood
- Natural Fibre Board
- Reclaimed lumber
- Timber recycling
