= Particle board =

Glued wood product

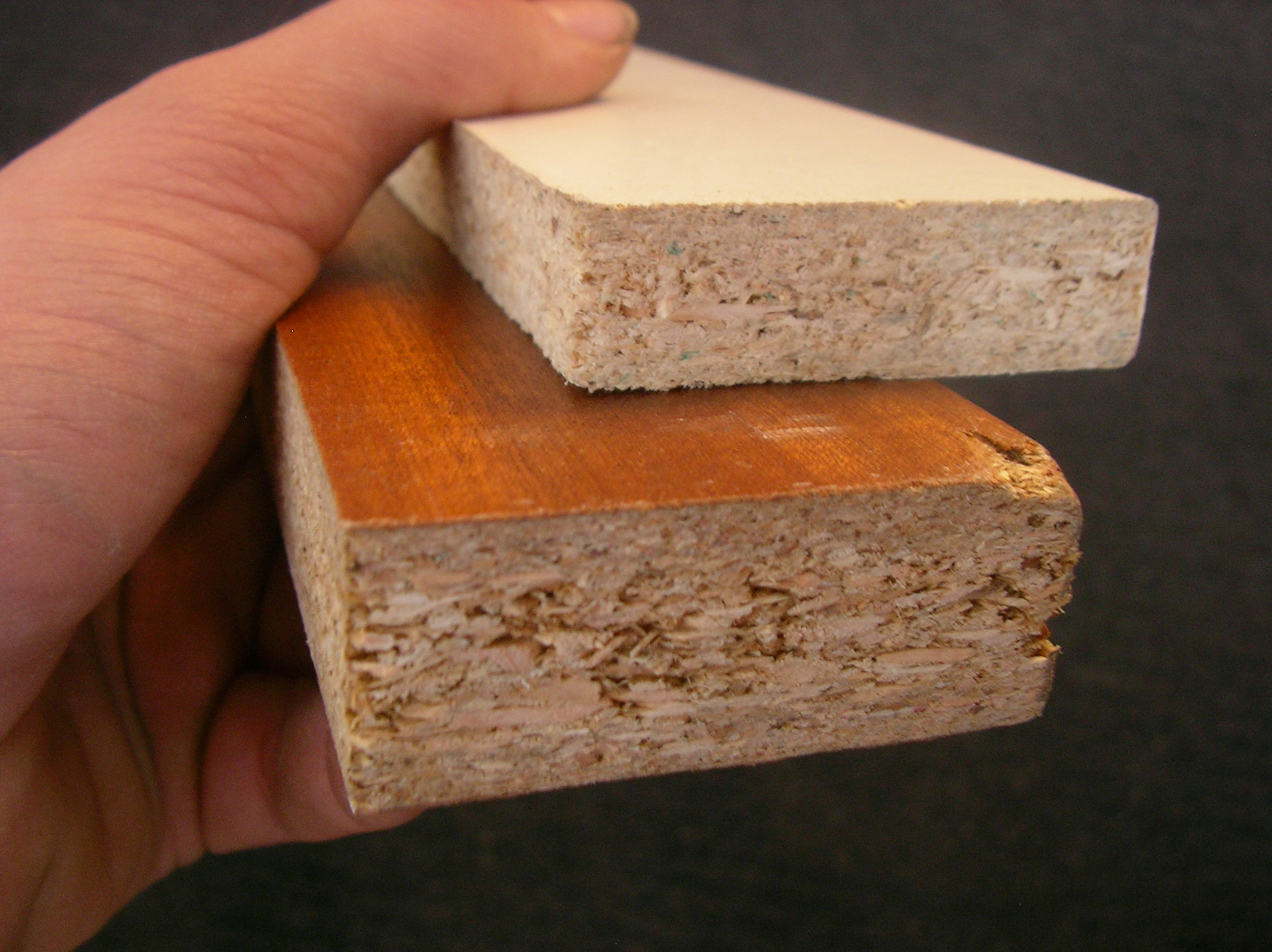
Particle board with veneer

Particle board, also known as particleboard or chipboard, is an engineered wood product, belonging to the wood-based panels, manufactured from wood chips and a synthetic, mostly formaldehyde-based resin or other suitable binder, which is pressed under a hot press, batch- or continuous-type, and produced. Particle board is often confused with oriented strand board (OSB, also known as flakeboard, or waferboard), a different type of fiberboard that uses machined wood flakes and offers more strength.

== Characteristics ==
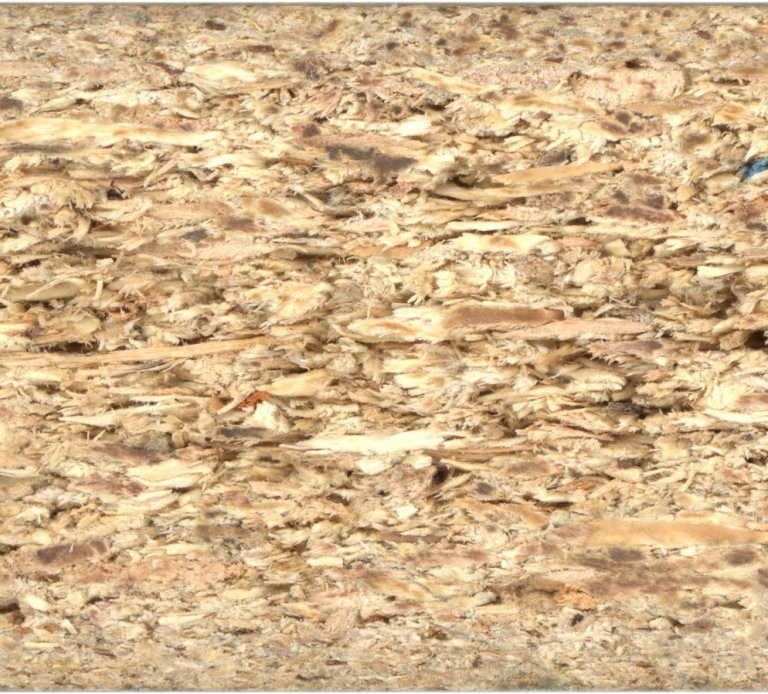
Cross section of a particle board

Particle board is cheaper, denser, and more uniform than conventional wood and plywood and is substituted for them when cost is more important than strength and appearance. Particle board can be made more appealing by painting or the use of wood veneers on visible surfaces. Though it is denser than conventional wood, it is the lightest and weakest type of fiberboard, except for insulation board. Medium-density fibreboard and hardboard, also called high-density fiberboard, are stronger and denser than particle board. Different grades of particle board have different densities, with higher density connoting greater strength and greater resistance to failure of screw fasteners.

A significant disadvantage of particle board is its susceptibility to expansion and discoloration from moisture absorption, particularly when it is not covered with paint or another sealer. Therefore, it is rarely used outdoors or in places where there are high levels of moisture, except in bathrooms, kitchens and laundries, where it is commonly used as an underlayment shielded beneath a moisture-resistant continuous sheet of vinyl flooring.

In dry environments, veneered particle board is preferred over veneered plywood because of its stability, lower cost, and convenience.

== History and development ==
The history of particle board is unclear. The nineteenth century saw many attempts to make use of sawmill by-products, including sawdust and wood chips, by manufacturing composite boards; conceptual references to processes of manufacturing wood composites similar to particle board date from 1887.

In 1932, Luftwaffe pilot and inventor Max Himmelheber patented a process for making particle board without fully impregnating wood fibers with adhesive, distinguishing it from earlier wood composites. This particle board could be produced with waste products such as planer shavings, off-cuts, or sawdust, hammer-milled into chips and bound together with a phenolic resin. Hammer-milling involves smashing material into smaller and smaller pieces until they can pass through a screen. Most early particle board manufacturers used similar processes, though often with slightly different resins.

It was found that better strength, appearance, and resin economy could be achieved by using more uniform, manufactured chips. Producers began processing solid birch, beech, alder, pine, and spruce into consistent chips and flakes; these finer layers were then placed on the outside of the board, with its core composed of coarser, cheaper chips. This type of board is known as three-layer particle board.

In 1935, Farley and Loetscher Manufacturing Co. became the first plant to manufacture particle board. A particle board industry developed over the course of the 1940s.

More recently, graded-density particle board has also evolved. It contains particles that gradually become smaller as they get closer to the surface.

== Manufacturing ==
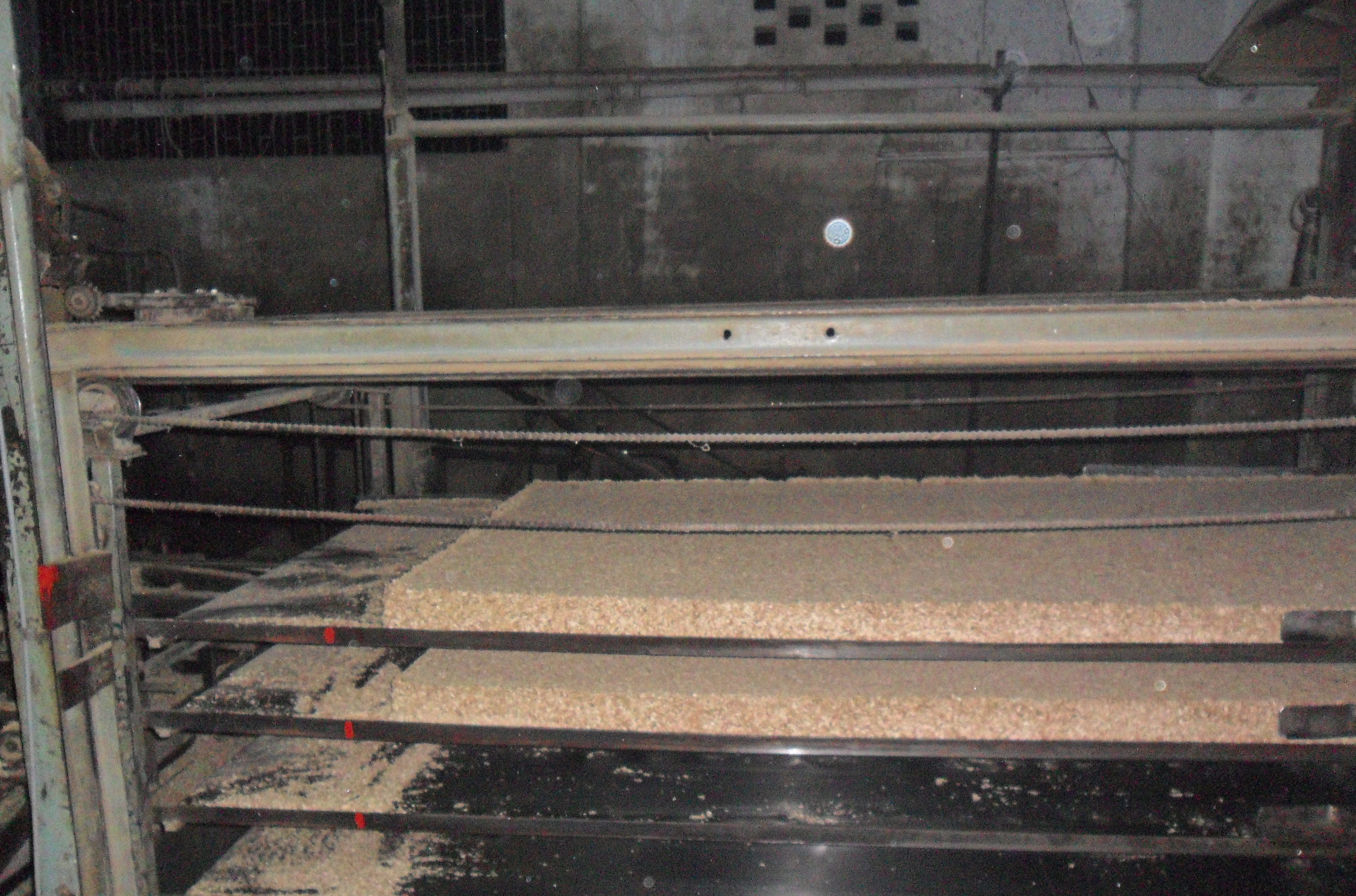
Jute-stick particle board manufacturing process

Particle board or chipboard is manufactured by mixing particles or flakes of wood or jute-stick together with a resin and forming the mixture into a sheet. The raw material is fed into a disc chipper with between four and sixteen radially arranged blades. The chips from disk chippers are more uniform in shape and size than from other types of wood chippers. The particles are then dried, and any oversize or undersized particles are screened out.

Resin is then sprayed as a fine mist onto the particles. Several types of resins are used in the process. Amino-formaldehyde-based resins are the best-performing based on cost and ease of use. Urea melamine resins offer water resistance, with more melamine offering higher resistance. It is typically used in external applications, with the coloured resin darkening the panel. To further enhance the panel properties, resorcinol resins can be mixed with phenolic resins, but that is more often used with marine plywood applications.

Panel production involves other chemicals including wax, dyes, wetting agents, and release agents, to aid processing or make the final product resistant to water, fire, or insects.

After the particles pass through a mist of resin sufficient to coat all surfaces, they are layered into a continuous "carpet". This carpet is then separated into discrete, rectangular "blankets" which will be compacted in a cold press. A scale weighs the flakes, and they are distributed by rotating rakes. In graded-density particle board, the flakes are spread by an air jet that throws finer particles further than coarse ones. Two such jets, reversed, allow the particles to build up from fine to coarse and back to fine.

The formed sheets are cold-compressed to reduce thickness and make them easier to transport. Later, they are compressed again, under pressures between 2 and 3 megapascals (290 and 440 psi) and temperatures between 140 and 220 °C (284 and 428 °F) to set and harden the glue. The entire process is controlled to ensure the correct size, density, and consistency of the board.

The boards are then cooled, trimmed, and sanded. They can then be sold as raw board or surface-improved through the addition of a wood veneer or laminate surface.

== Furniture design ==
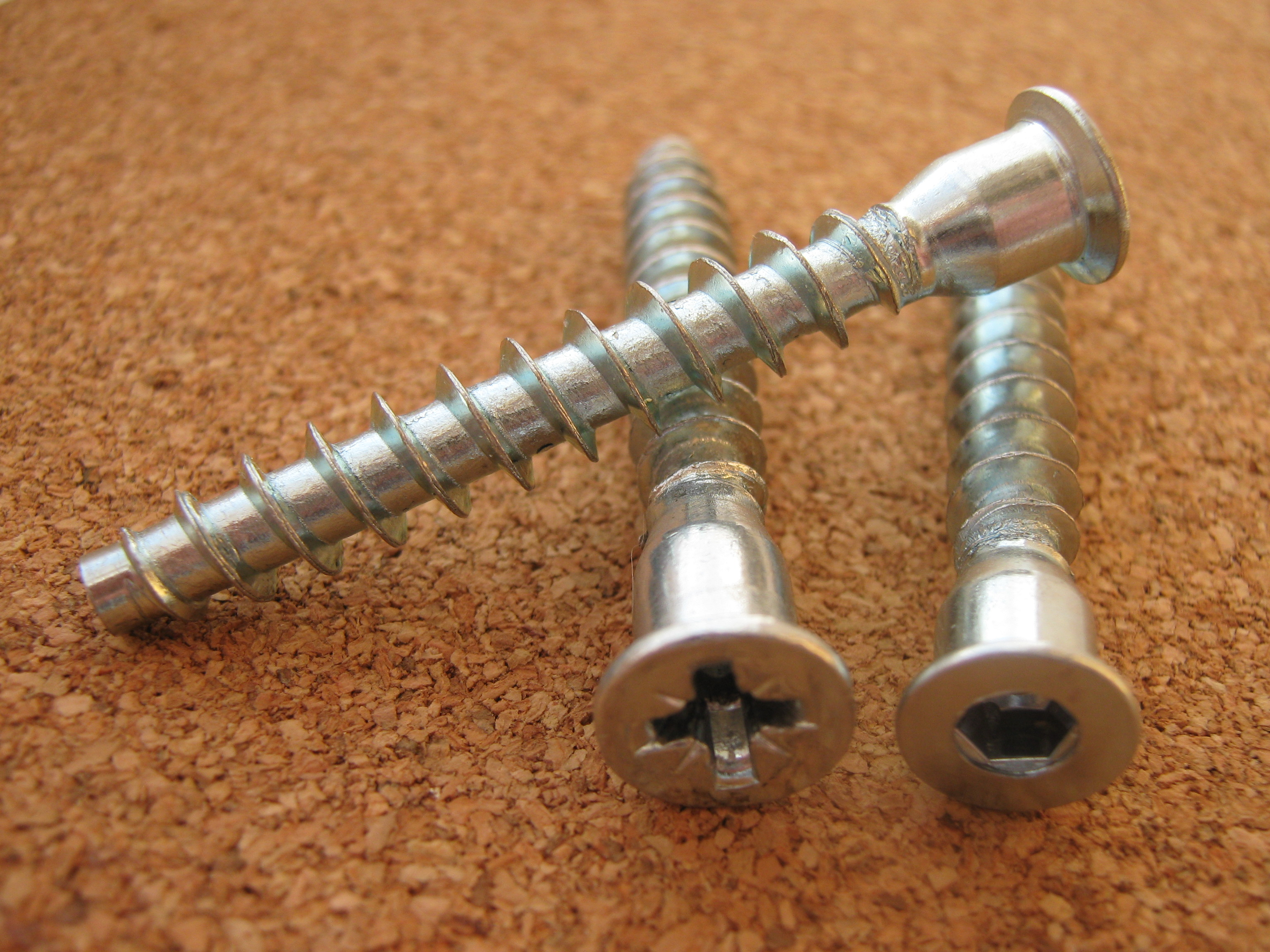
A close-up of confirmat screws. They are widely used in particle board furniture.

Particle board has had a huge influence on furniture design. In the early 1950s, particle-board kitchens started to come into use in furniture construction but, in many cases, it remained more expensive than solid wood. A particle-board kitchen was only available to the very wealthy. Once the technology was more developed, particle board became cheaper.

Some large companies base their strategies around providing furniture at a low price. To do this, they use the least expensive materials possible. In almost all cases, this means particle board, medium-density fibreboard (MDF), or the like. However, in order to maintain a reputation for quality at low cost, manufacturers may use higher grades of particle board, e.g., higher-density particle board, thicker particle board, or particle board using higher-quality resins. One may note the amount of sag in a shelf of a given width in order to draw the distinction.

In general, the much lower cost of sheet goods (particle board, medium density fiberboard, and other engineered wood products) has helped to displace solid wood from many cabinetry applications.

== Safety ==
Safety concerns exist for both manufacturing and use. Fine dust and chemicals are released when particle board is machined (e.g., sawing or routing). Occupational exposure limits exist in many countries recognizing the hazard of wood dusts. Cutting particle board can release formaldehyde, carbon monoxide, hydrogen cyanide in the case of amino resins, and phenol in the case of phenol formaldehyde resins.

The other safety concern is the slow release of formaldehyde over time. In 1984, concerns about the high indoor levels of formaldehyde in new manufactured homes led the United States Department of Housing and Urban Development to set construction standards. Particle board (PB), medium-density fibreboard (MDF), oriented strand board (OSB), and laminated flooring have been major sources of formaldehyde emissions. In response to consumer and woodworker pressure on the industry, PB and MDF became available in "no added formaldehyde" (NAF) versions, but were not in common use as of 2015. Many other building materials such as furniture finish, carpeting, and caulking give off formaldehyde, as well as urea-formaldehyde foam insulation, which is banned in Canada for installation in a residential closed-cavity wall. Formaldehyde is classified by the WHO as a known human carcinogen.

== See also ==
- Glued laminated timber
- Haskelite, a brand of plywood using waterproof glue
- Masonite, made from steam-cooked fibres
