= Oriented strand board =

Engineered wood particle board

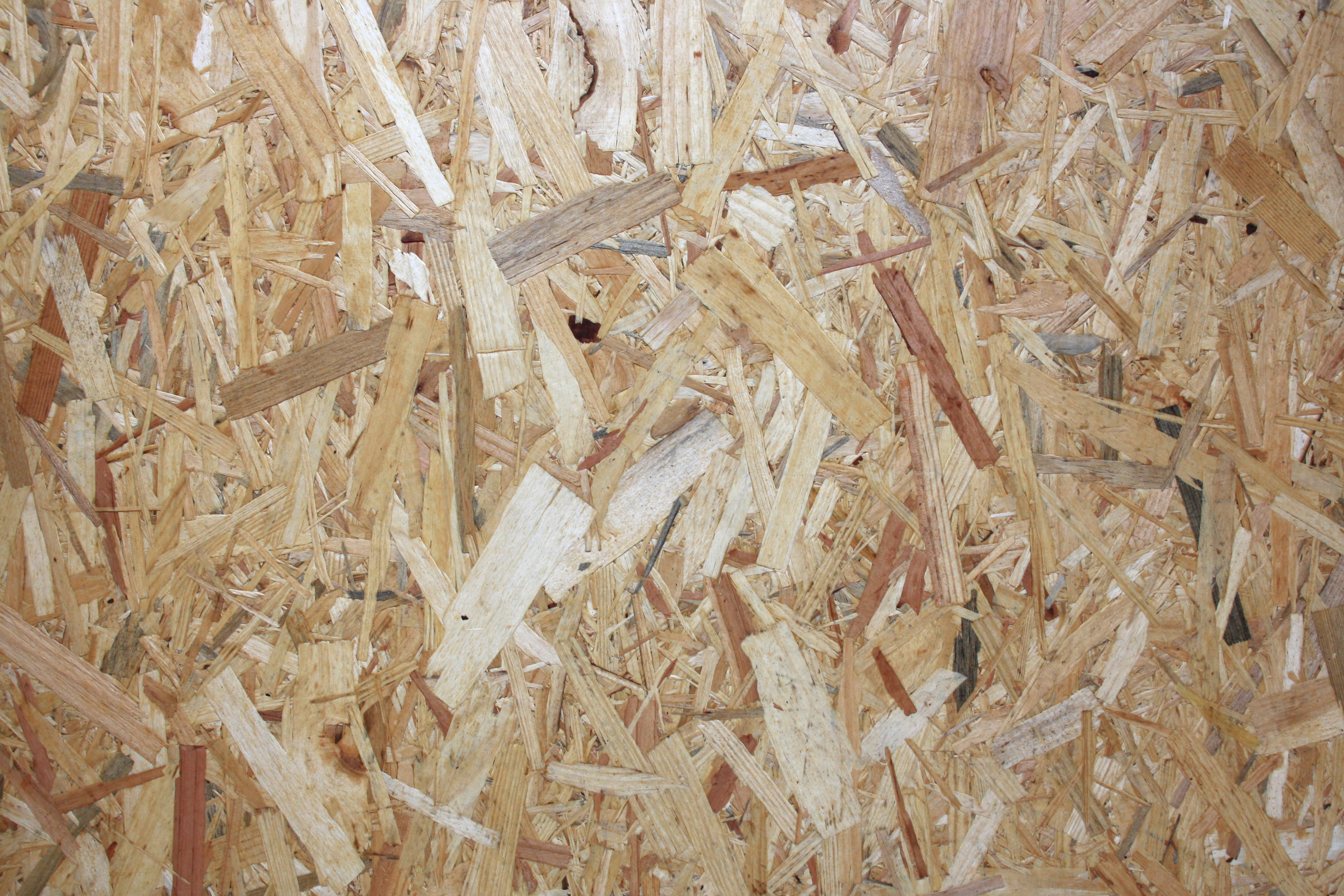
OSB is easily identifiable by its characteristic wood strands.

Oriented strand board (OSB) is a type of engineered wood, formed by adding adhesives to layers of wood strands (flakes) laid in specific orientations and compressing them. It was invented by Armin Elmendorf in California in 1963. OSB may have a rough and variegated surface with the individual strips of around 2.5 cm × 15 cm (1.0 by 5.9 inches), lying unevenly across each other, and is produced in a variety of types and thicknesses.

Oriented strand board is sometimes confused with chipboard, a synonym for particle board, whose "chips" are of a size that a lay person would likely describe as "particles".

== Uses ==
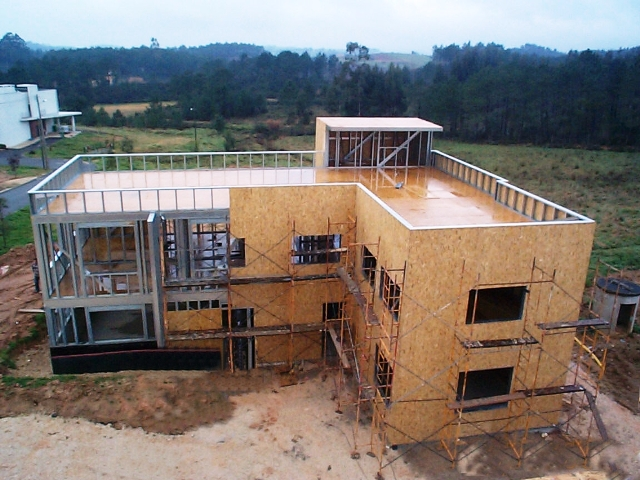
OSB is frequently used in light steel frame house construction.

OSB's mechanical properties make it suitable for load-bearing uses in construction. In North America, it is more popular than plywood, commanding 66% of the structural panel market in 2016. The most common uses are as sheathing in walls, flooring, and roof decking. For exterior walls, panels are available with a radiant-barrier layer laminated to one side; this eases installation and increases energy performance of the building envelope. OSB is also used in furniture production.

== Manufacturing ==
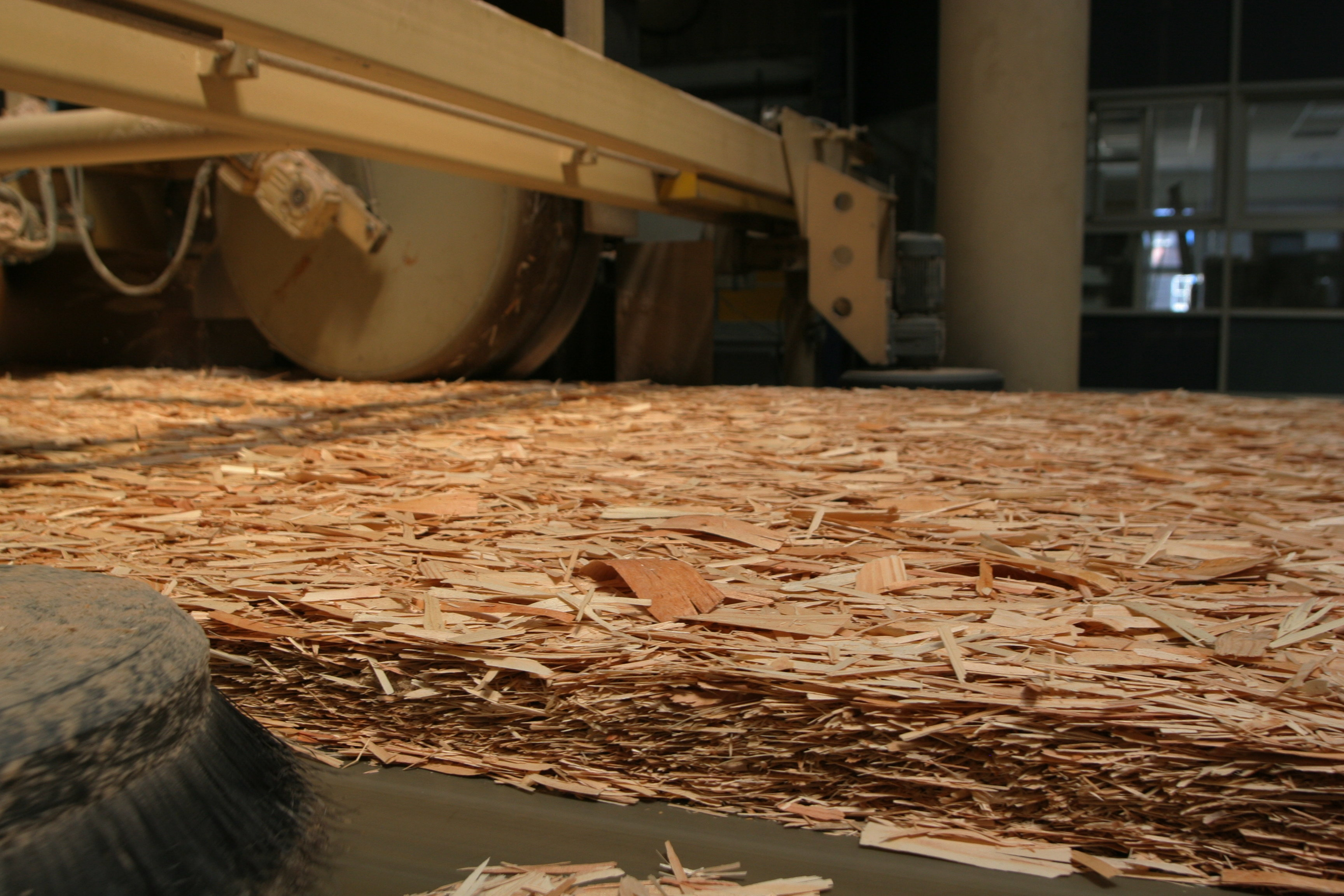
OSB in production before pressing in a thermal press

Oriented strand board is manufactured in wide mats from cross-oriented layers of thin, rectangular wooden strips compressed and bonded together with wax and synthetic resin adhesives.

The adhesive resins types used include: urea-formaldehyde (OSB type 1, nonstructural, nonwaterproof); isocyanate-based glue (or PMDI poly-methylene diphenyl diisocyanate–based) in inner regions with melamine-urea-formaldehyde or phenol formaldehyde resin glues at surface (OSB type 2, structural, water resistant on face); phenol formaldehyde resin throughout (OSB types 3 and 4, structural, for use in damp and outside environments).

The layers are created by shredding the wood into strips, which are sifted and then oriented on a belt or wire-mesh caul (a heated, ventilated support) and coated with the resin. The layers thus built up are transferred to a forming line and cross-oriented so that strips on the external layers are aligned to the panel's strength axis, while the internal layers are perpendicular. The number of layers placed is determined partly by the thickness of the panel, and is limited by the equipment used. Individual layers can also vary in thickness to give different finished panel thicknesses; typically, a 15 cm (5.9 in) layer will produce a 15 mm (0.59 in) panel thickness. The mat is placed in a thermal press to compress the flakes and bond them by heat activation and curing of the resin. Individual panels are then cut from the mats into finished sizes. Most of the world's OSB is made in the United States and Canada in large production facilities.

== Related products ==
Waferboard belongs to the subset of reconstituted wood panel products called flakeboards. It is a structural material made from rectangular wood flakes of controlled length and thickness bonded together with waterproof phenolic resin under extreme heat and pressure. The layers of flakes are not oriented, which makes it easier to manufacture. Waferboard is used as a material to build cheap furniture. This type of furniture is usually laminated.

Materials other than wood have been used to produce products similar to OSB. Oriented structural straw board is an engineered board made by splitting straw and formed by adding P-MDI adhesives and then hot compressing layers of straw in specific orientations. Strand board can also be made from bagasse.

== Production ==
In 2005, Canadian production was 10.5 million square metres (113 million square feet) (3/8 in or 9.5 mm basis) of which 8.78 million square metres (94.5 million square feet) were exported, almost entirely to the United States. In 2014, Romania became the largest OSB-exporting country in Europe, with 28% of the exports going to Russia and 16% to Ukraine.

== Properties ==
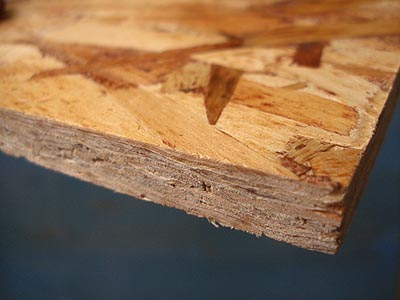
OSB, closeup of corner

Adjustments to the manufacturing process can affect thickness, panel size, strength, and rigidity. OSB panels have no internal gaps or voids, and can be water-resistant, although they do require additional membranes to achieve impermeability to water and are not recommended for exterior use. The finished product has properties similar to plywood, but is uniform and cheaper. When tested to failure, OSB has a greater load-bearing capacity than milled wood panels. It has replaced plywood in many environments, especially the North American structural panel market.

All wood-based structural use panels can be cut and installed with the same types of equipment as for solid wood.

=== Health and safety ===
The resins used to create OSB have raised questions about their emission of volatile organic compounds such as formaldehyde, although industry trade groups assert that formaldehyde emissions from North American OSB are "negligible or nonexistent". Urea-formaldehyde is more toxic and should be avoided in home use. Phenol-formaldehyde products are considered to be relatively hazard free. Some newer types of OSB, so-called "new-generation" panels, use isocyanate resins that contain no formaldehyde and are considered nonvolatile when cured.

Some manufacturers treat the wood chips with various borate compounds that are toxic to termites, wood-boring beetles, molds, and fungi, but not mammals in applied doses.

In 2024, a hotel in Dublin, Ireland, lost its fire safety certificate after an inspection found fault with the composition of OSB in its flooring and walls.

=== Types ===
Five grades of OSB are defined in EN 300 in terms of their mechanical performance and relative resistance to moisture:

- OSB/0 – No added formaldehyde
- OSB/1 – General-purpose boards and boards for interior fitments (including furniture) for use in dry conditions
- OSB/2 – Load-bearing boards for use in dry conditions
- OSB/3 – Load-bearing boards for use in humid conditions
- OSB/4 – Heavy-duty load-bearing boards for use in humid conditions

== See also ==
- Medium-density fibreboard, engineered board with much smaller flakes
