= Wood fibre =

Part of a plant

Wood fibres (also spelled wood fibers, see spelling differences) are usually cellulosic elements that are extracted from trees and used to make materials including paper.

The end paper product (paper, paperboard, tissue, cardboard, etc.) dictates the species, or species blend, that is best suited to provide the desirable sheet characteristics, and also dictates the required fibre processing (chemical treatment, heat treatment, mechanical "brushing" or refining, etc.).

In North America, virgin (non-recycled) wood fibre is primarily extracted from hardwood (deciduous) trees and softwood (coniferous) trees. The wood fibre can be extracted as a primary product, or collected during the milling of lumber. Wood fibres can also be recycled from used paper materials.

== Paper ==
Wood fibres are treated by combining them with other additives which break down the fibres into a spongy mass called pulp. The pulp is then processed, and the network of tiny fibres is pressed flat, becoming paper.

== Construction material ==
Wood fibres can be pressed into various types of flat boards, used as insulation, renderboard and sarking. Densities vary from 60 kg/m3 insulation boards to 180 kg/m3 render boards. Some types of woodfibre are flexible, others very rigid. Flexible insulation is designed to be friction-installed between timbers or fitted on top of somewhat irregular surfaces

There are manufacturers in Poland (Beltermo, Steico), Germany (Gutex, Steico HQ), France (Pavatex) and Norway (Hunton)..

There are two different manufacturing processes: wet and dry.

In the wet-process, chipped, waste timber is ground up into small pieces then boiled up with water and a few other chemicals designed to break down the timber into the fibres. During this process, many of the sugars which are of interest to fungus and mould are removed. This slurry is then poured on to a belt sieve and compressed to remove as much water as possible and heated with steam to bond the fibres together. The steaming process softens the natural lignin around the fibres which holds the fibres together in the board, which is typically manufactured to around 20mm thickness. These boards are then laminated up with a water based glue into thicker layers to produce boards up to around 120mm thick.

In the dry-process waste timber is dried and ground up into fibres, then mixed with a synthetic glue called PMDI (polymeric methylene diphenyl diisocyanate). PMDI is a polyurethane based glue which is used in fairly small quantities (3-4% by mass). This is essentially the same glue used in OSB and MDF. The mixture is then laid on a conveyor belt and compressed to the correct thickness and density, then steam is applied to cure the boards. These boards are made to the desired thickness and are not usually laminated.

Wet-process boards are typically denser and have much stronger capilliary action to move water around. The dry process consumes less energy.

== Hydroculture ==
Wood fibres can be used as a substrate in hydroponics. Wood wool (i.e. wood slivers) have been a substrate of choice since the earliest days of the hydroponics research. However, more recent research suggests that wood fibre can have detrimental effects on "plant growth regulators".

== Composites ==
Wood fibres can be combined with thermoplastics to create strong, waterproof products for outdoor use, such as deck boards or outdoor furniture.

== See also ==
- Hemp paper
- Pulp (paper)
- Woodfibre, British Columbia
- Wood flour, a form of wood fibre
