= Lamination =

Technique of fusing layers of material

Simulated flight (using image stack created by μCT scanning) through the length of a knitting needle that consists of laminated wooden layers: the layers can be differentiated by the change of direction of the wood's vessels

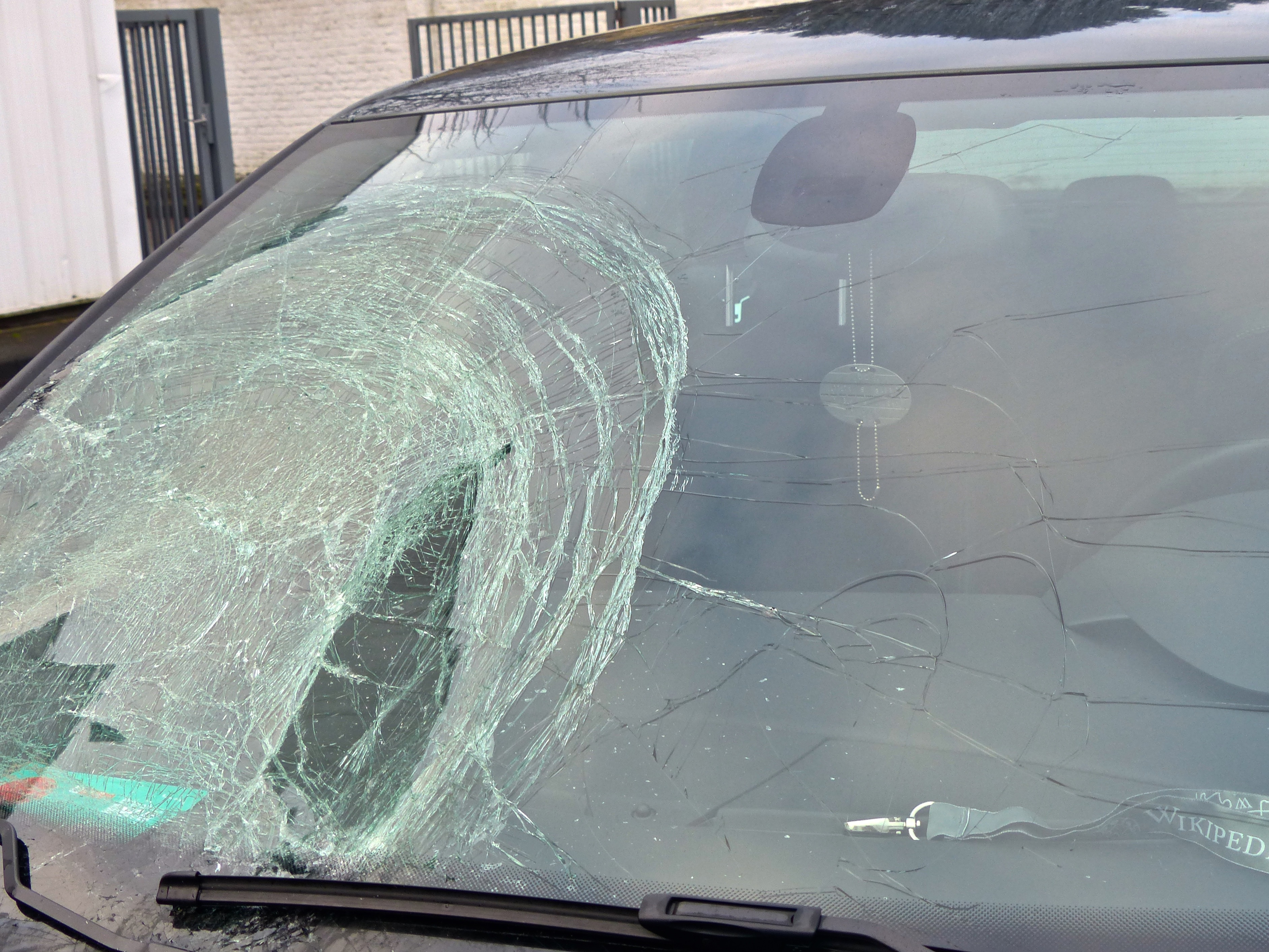
Shattered windshield lamination keeps shards in place

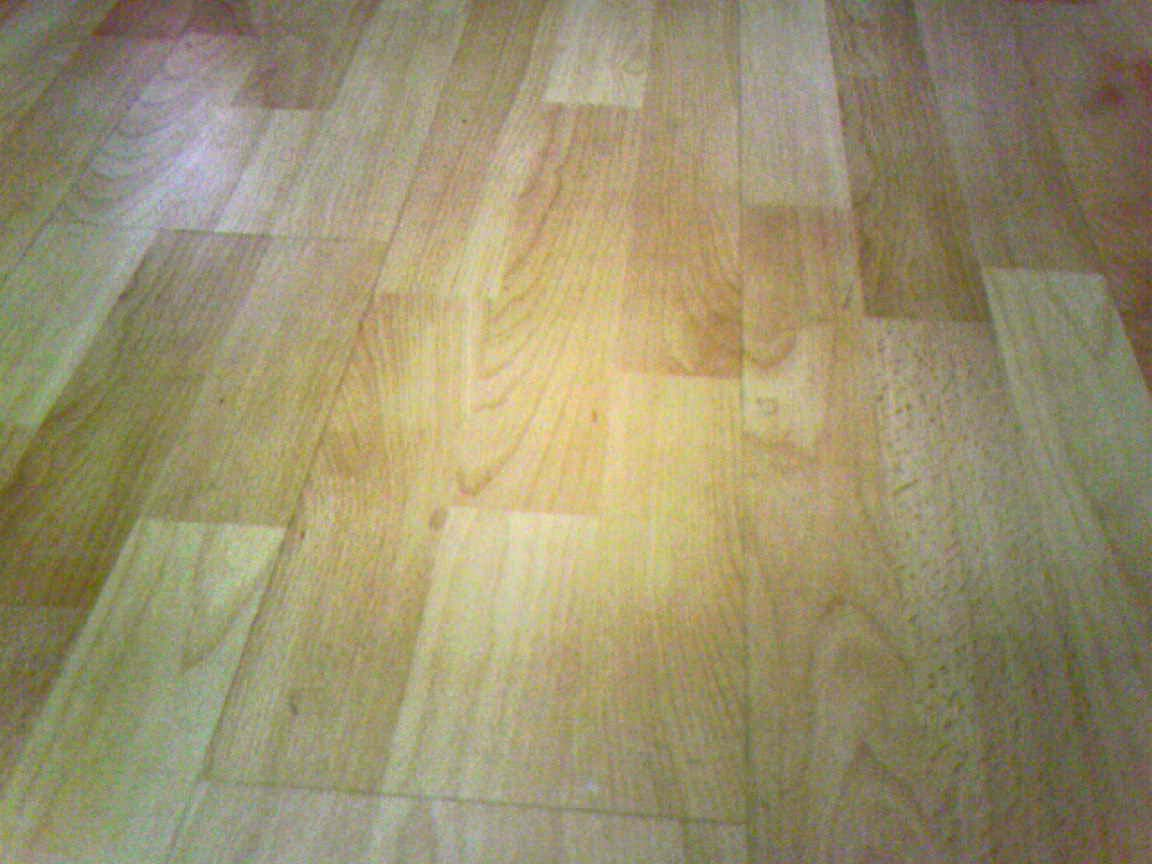
Laminate flooring

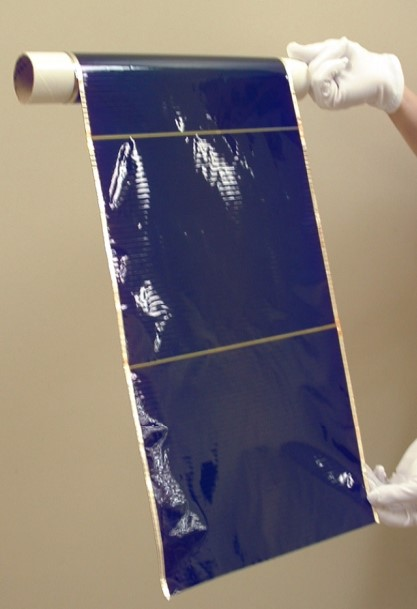
A flexible thin-film solar cell for aerospace use (2007)

Lamination is the technique/process of manufacturing a material in multiple layers, so that the composite material achieves improved strength, stability, sound insulation, appearance, or other properties from the use of the differing materials, such as plastic. A laminate is a layered object or material assembled using heat, pressure, welding, or adhesives. Various coating machines, machine presses and calendering equipment are used.

Lamination may be applied to textiles, glass, wood, or other materials. Laminating paper in plastic makes it sturdy, waterproof, and erasable. Laminating metals and electronic components may provide electrical insulation and other benefits.

== Materials ==
There are different lamination processes, depending primarily on the type or types of materials to be laminated. The materials used in laminates can be identical or different, depending on the object to be laminated, the process and the desired properties.

=== Textile ===
Laminated fabric are widely used in different fields of human activity, including medical and military. Woven fabrics (organic and inorganic based) are usually laminated by different chemical polymers to give them useful properties like chemical resistance, dust, grease, photoluminescence (glowing and other light-effects e.g. in high-visibility clothing), tear strength, stiffness, thickness, and being wind proof . Coated fabrics may be considered as a subtype of laminated fabrics. Nonwoven fabrics (e.g. fiberglass) are also often laminated. According to a 2002 source, the nonwovens fabric industry was the biggest single consumer of different polymer binding resins.

Materials used in production of coated and laminated fabrics are generally subjected to heat treatment. Thermoplastics and thermosetting plastics (e.g. formaldehyde polymers) are equally used in laminating and coating textile industry. In 2002 primary materials used included polyvinyl acetate, acrylics, polyvinyl chloride (PVC), polyurethanes, and natural and synthetic rubbers. Copolymers and terpolymers were also in use.

Thin-films of plastics were in wide use as well. Materials varied from polyethylene and PVC to kapton depending on application. In automotive industry for example the PVC/acrylonitrilebutadiene-styrene (ABS) mixtures were often applied for interiors by laminating onto a polyurethane foam to give a soft-touch properties. Specialty films were used in protective clothing, .e.g. polytetrafluoroethylene (PTFE), polyurethane etc.

=== Glass ===
Plastic film can be used to laminate either side of a sheet of glass. Vehicle windshields are commonly made as composites created by laminating a tough plastic film between two layers of glass. This is to prevent shards of glass detaching from the windshield in case it breaks.

=== Wood ===
Plywood is a common example of a laminate using the same material in each layer combined with an adhesive. Glued and laminated dimensional timber is used in the construction industry to make beams (glued laminated timber, or Glulam), in sizes larger and stronger than those that can be obtained from single pieces of wood. Another reason to laminate wooden strips into beams is quality control, as with this method each and every strip can be inspected before it becomes part of a highly stressed component.

Examples of laminate materials include melamine adhesive countertop surfacing and plywood. Decorative laminates and some modern millwork components are produced with decorative papers with a layer of overlay on top of the decorative paper, set before pressing them with thermoprocessing into high-pressure decorative laminates (HPDL). A new type of HPDL is produced using real wood veneer or multilaminar veneer as top surface. High-pressure laminates consists of laminates "molded and cured at pressures not lower than 1,000 lb per sq in. (70 kg per cm^{2}) and more commonly in the range of 1,200 to 2,000 lb per sq in. (84 to 140 kg per cm^{2}). Meanwhile, low pressure laminate is defined as "a plastic laminate molded and cured at pressures in general of 400 pounds per square inch (approximately 27 atmospheres or 2.8 × 106 pascals).

=== Paper ===
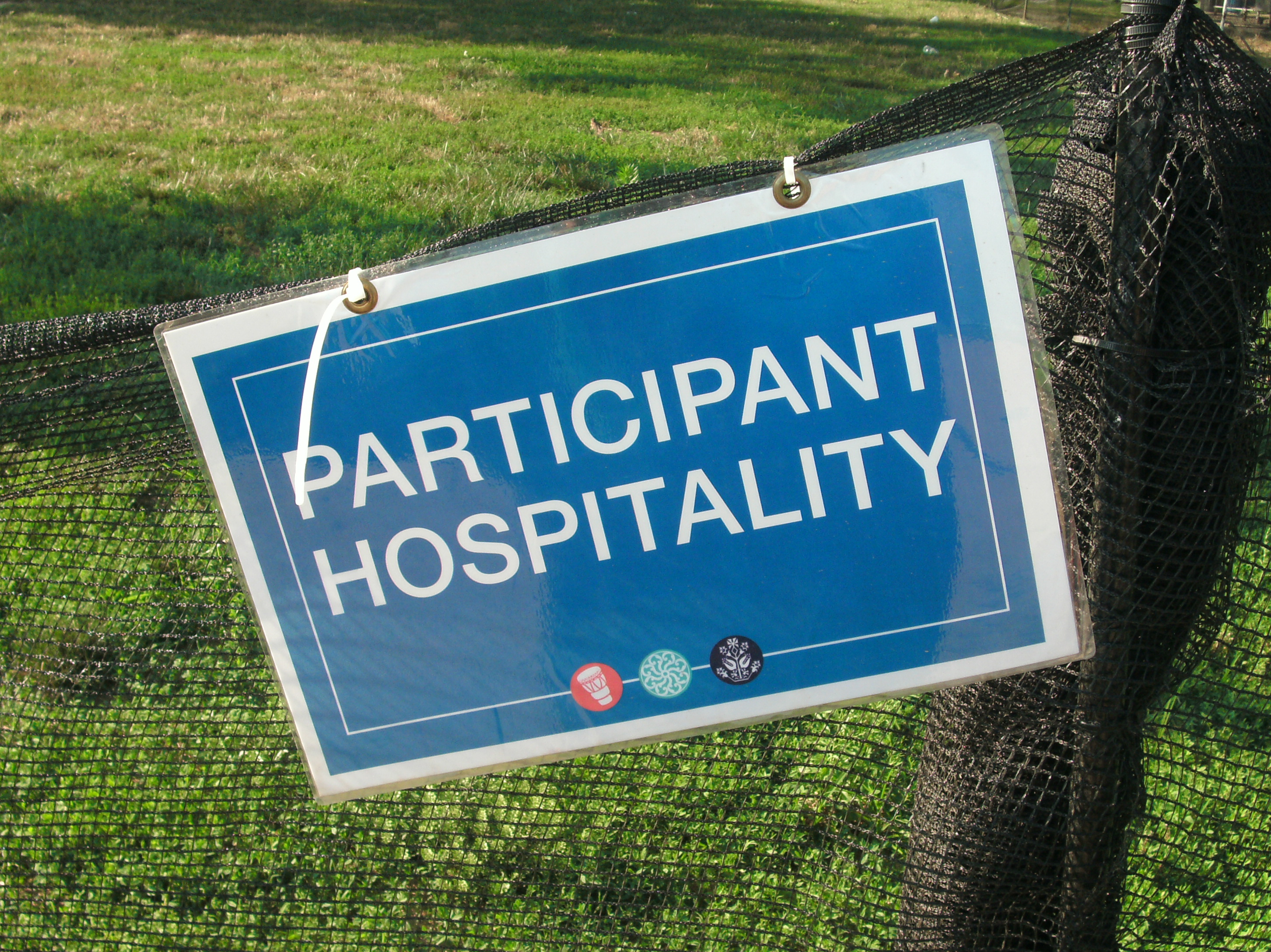
A paper sign that has been laminated so it could be used outdoors

Corrugated fiberboard boxes are examples of laminated structures, where an inner core provides rigidity and strength, and the outer layers provide a smooth surface. A starch-based adhesive is usually used.

Laminating paper (including coated paper such as glossy, matte, or soft-touch finishes) products, such as photographs, can prevent them from becoming creased, faded, water damaged, wrinkled, stained, smudged, abraded, or marked by grease or fingerprints. Photo identification cards and credit cards are almost always laminated with plastic film. Boxes and other containers may be laminated using heat seal layers, extrusion coatings, pressure sensitive adhesives, UV coating, etc.

Gloss lamination provides a "shiny" finish that can make colors appear more vibrant, while matte lamination offers a non-reflective surface that helps reduce glare. A "soft-touch" laminate can be applied as a thin polymer film to give a "velvety" tactile feel while adding a protective layer.

Lamination is also used in sculpture using wood or resin. An example of an artist who used lamination in his work is the American Floyd Shaman.

Laminates can be used to add properties to a surface, usually printed paper, that would not have them otherwise, such as with the use of lamination paper. Sheets of vinyl impregnated with ferro-magnetic material can allow portable printed images to bond to magnets, such as for a custom bulletin board or a visual presentation. Specially surfaced plastic sheets can be laminated over a printed image to allow them to be safely written upon, such as with dry erase markers or chalk. Multiple translucent printed images may be laminated in layers to achieve certain visual effects or to hold holographic images. Printing businesses that do commercial lamination keep a variety of laminates on hand, as the process for bonding different types is generally similar when working with thin materials.

Paper is normally laminated on particle or fiberboards giving a good-looking and resistant surface for use as furniture, decoration panels and flooring.

Paper laminations are also used in packaging. For example, juiceboxes are fabricated from liquid packaging board which is usually six layers of paper, polyethylene, and aluminum foil. Paper is used in the lamination to shape the product and give the juicebox an extra source of strength.

The base is most often particle- or fiberboards, then some layers of absorbent kraft paper. The last layers are a decor paper covered with an overlay. The lamination papers are covered with an inert resin, often melamine, which is cured to form a hard composite with the structure of paper. The laminates may also have a lining on the back side of laminating kraft to compensate for the tension created by the top side lamination. Cheaper particle boards may have only a lining of laminating kraft to give surface washability and resistance to wear.

The decor paper can also be processed under heat and low/high pressure to create a melamine laminated sheet, that has several applications. The absorbent kraft paper is a normal kraft paper with controlled absorbency, which means a high degree of porosity. It is made of clean low kappa hardwood kraft with good uniformity. The grammage is 80 - 120 g/m^{2} and normally 2-4 plies are used. The decor paper is the most critical of the lamination papers as it gives the visual appearance of the laminate. The impregnation resin and cellulose have about the same refraction index which means that the cellulose fibers of the paper appear as a shade and only the dyestuffs and pigments are visible. Due to this the decor paper demands extreme cleanness and is produced only on small paper machines with grammage 50 - 150 g/m^{2}. The overlay paper have grammage of 18 – 50 m^{2} and is made of pure cellulose, thus it must be made of well delignified pulp. It becomes transparent after impregnation letting the appearance of the decor paper come through. The laminating kraft have a grammage of 70 - 150 g/m^{2} and is a smooth dense kraft paper.

=== Metal ===
Electrical equipment such as transformers and motors usually use an electrical steel laminate coatings to form the core of the coils used to produce magnetic fields. The thin lamination reduces the power loss due to eddy currents. Fiber metal laminate is an example of thin metal laminated by, a glass fiber-reinforced and epoxy-glued sheets.

=== Microelectronics ===
Lamination is widely used in production of electronic components such as PV solar cells.

== Film types ==
Laminate plastic film is generally categorized into these five categories:

- Standard thermal laminating films
- Low-temperature thermal laminating films
- Heat set (or heat-assisted) laminating films
- Pressure-sensitive films
- Liquid laminate

== Laminators ==
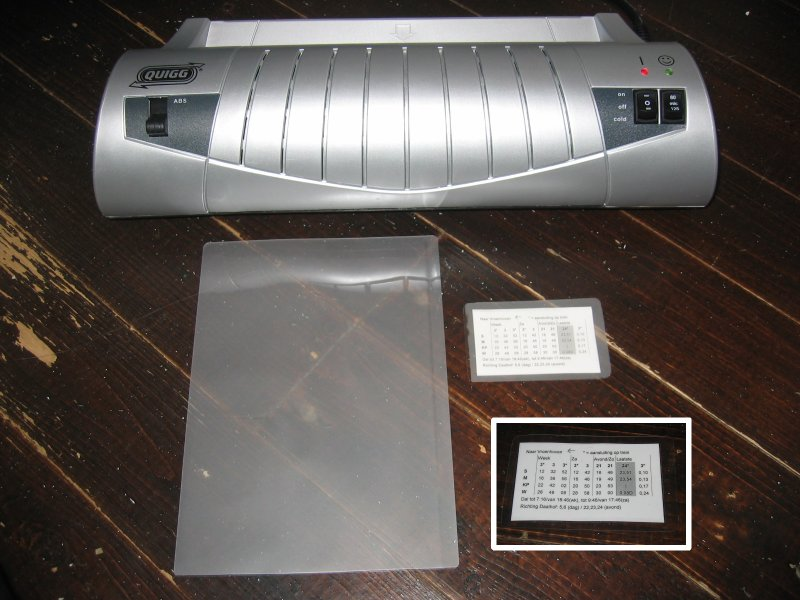
A pouch laminator with two laminate pouches, ready to be laminated; inset, a laminated card

A laminator is a device which laminates pieces or rolls of paper or card stock, common in offices, schools, and homes.

=== Pouch ===
A pouch laminator uses a plastic pouch that is usually sealed on one edge. The inside of the lamination pouch is coated with a heat-activated film that adheres to the product being laminated as it runs through the laminator. The substrate side of the board contains a heat-activated adhesive that bonds the print to the substrate. This can be any of a number of board products or another sheet of laminate. The pouch containing the print, laminate, and substrate is passed through a set of heated rollers under pressure, ensuring that all adhesive layers bond to one another.

Pouch laminators are designed for moderate use in the office or home. For continuous, large-volume lamination projects, a roll laminator performs more efficiently.

Pouches can be bought with different thicknesses in micrometres. Standard home or office machines normally use 80–250 micrometre pouches, depending on the quality of the machine. The thicker the pouch, the higher the cost. Pouches can also measured in mil, which equals one thousandth of an inch. The most common pouch thicknesses are 3, 5, 7 and 10 mil (76, 127, 178 and 254 μm).

Certain pouches such as butterfly pouches can be used with a pouch laminator to form ID cards. Butterfly pouches are available with magnetic stripes embedded.

Many pouch laminators require the use of a carrier. A carrier holds the pouch as it is run through the laminator. This helps prevent the hot glue, some of which leaks from the sides of the pouches during the process, from gumming up the rollers. The carrier prevents the rollers from getting sticky, which helps to prevent the lamination pouch from wrapping around the rollers inside the laminator.

Many newer laminators claim that they can be used without a carrier. However the use of carriers will extend the laminator's life.

=== Heated roll ===
Woman laminating signs and small cards using heated roll lamination machine

A heated roll laminator uses heated rollers to melt glue extruded onto lamination film. This film is in turn applied to a substrate such as paper or card using pressure rollers. The primary purpose of laminating with such a machine is to embellish or protect printed documents or images. Heated roll laminators can vary in size from handheld or desktop pouch laminators to industrial sized machines. Such industrial laminators are primarily used for high quantity/quality output by printers or print finishers.

Such laminators are used to apply varying thicknesses of lamination film onto substrates such as paper or fabrics. The main advantage of the use of heated roll laminators is speed. Heated laminators use heated rollers or heated shoes to melt the glue which is applied to lamination film. The process of heating the glue prior to applying the film to a substrate allows for a faster application of the film. The laminates and adhesives used are generally cheaper to manufacture than cold roll laminates, often as much as half the cost depending on the comparison made. As the materials are non-adhesive until exposed to heat, they are much easier to handle. The glue is solid at room temperature, so lamination of this type is less likely to shift or warp after its application than pressure activated laminates, which rely on a highly viscous, adhesive fluid.

Roll laminators typically use two rolls to complete the lamination process, with one roll being on top and the other roll on the bottom. These rolls slide onto metal bars, known as mandrels, which are then placed in the machine and feed through it. In the United States, the most common core size found on lamination film is one inch (25- to 27-inch-wide film). Larger format laminators use a larger core, often 2 1/4 to 3 inches in diameter. Film is usually available in 1.5, 3, 5, 7, and 10 mil thicknesses. The higher the number, the thicker the film. A mil is one thousandth of an inch (.001").

Printers or print finishers often use industrial heated roll laminators to laminate such things as paperback book covers, magazine covers, posters, business cards, presentation folders, and postcards, in-shop displays as well as other applications.

=== Cold roll ===
Cold roll laminators use a plastic film which is coated with an adhesive and glossy backing which does not adhere to the glue. When the glossy backing is removed, the adhesive is exposed, which then sticks directly onto the item which needs to be laminated. This method, apart from having the obvious benefit of not requiring expensive equipment, is also suitable for those items which would be damaged by heat. Cold laminators range from simple two roller, hand-crank machines up to large and complex motor-driven machines with high precision rollers, adjustable roller pressure, and other advanced features.

Cold lamination increased in popularity with the rise of wide-format inkjet printers, which often used inks and papers incompatible with hot lamination. A large percentage of cold laminate for use in the print industry is PVC, although a wide range of other materials are available. Cold laminating processes are also used outside of the print industry, for example, coating sheet glass or stainless steel with protective films.

Cold roll laminators are also used for laying down adhesive films in the sign-making industry, for example mounting a large print onto a board. A practiced operator can apply a large adhesive sheet in a fraction of the time it takes to do so by hand.

== See also ==
- Laminated bow – Type of archery bow
- Laminator – Technique of fusing layers of material
- Converter (industry) – Specialist in combining raw materials to create new products
- Cladding (metalworking) – Bonding of metals through extrusion
- Composite laminates – Assembly of layers of fibrous composite materials
- Composite material – Material made from a combination of two or more unlike substances
- Carbon-fibre reinforced plastic – Light, strong and rigid composite material
- Glass-reinforced plastic – Type of plastic reinforced by glass fiber
- Delamination – Mode of failure for which a material fractures into layers
- Void (composites) – Empty space in mixed materials
- Calender
