= Veneer hammer =

Woodworking tool

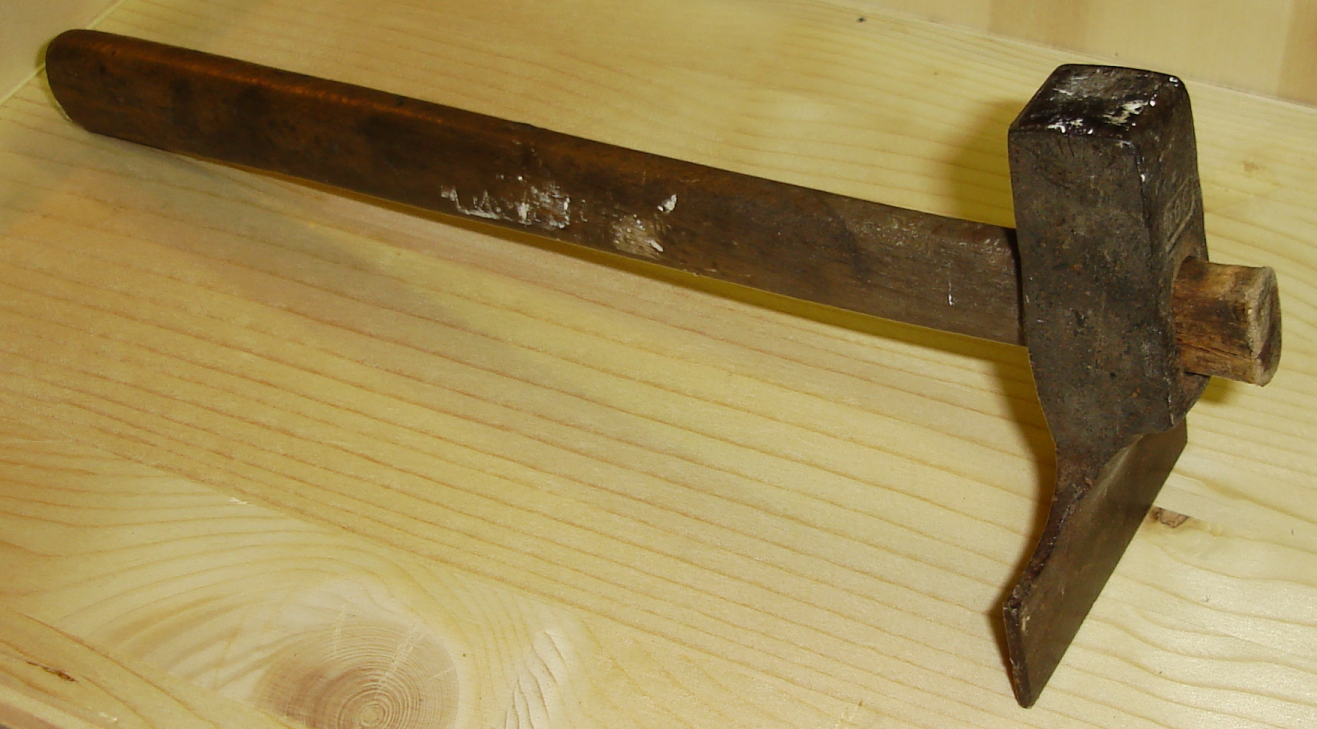
- Other names: Veneering hammer
- Classification: Woodworking hand tool

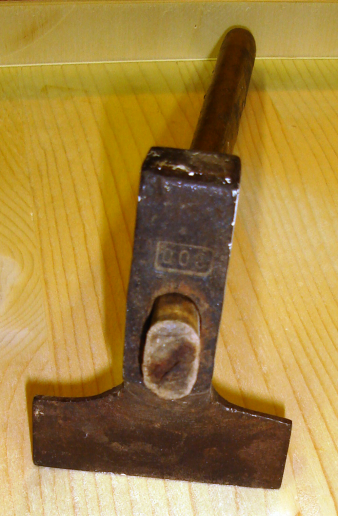
Front view of a veneering hammer

A veneer hammer (or veneering hammer) is a woodworking tool used in applying veneer.

== Description ==
A veneer hammer is used in conjunction with hot hide glue in applying veneer to a substrate. The term "veneer hammer" is somewhat misleading, as the tool is used more like a squeegee rather than a striking tool (hammer).

The veneer hammer itself has a dull blade, approximately three inches wide, on one side of the head, and a square shaped face on the other side. This head is connected to a standard handle, much like a regular hammer. The small square face is designed to be pushed down manually, exerting force to the blade side of the head. A veneer hammer is typically used with one hand pressing down vertically, and the other drawing the blade horizontally.

Workers often make their own veneer hammer, often having a wider "blade" than the commercially available ones. The blade can be made from metal or wood. The important factor is that the shape of the blade be somewhat tapered, permitting the required force to be applied directly under the blade.

== Operation ==
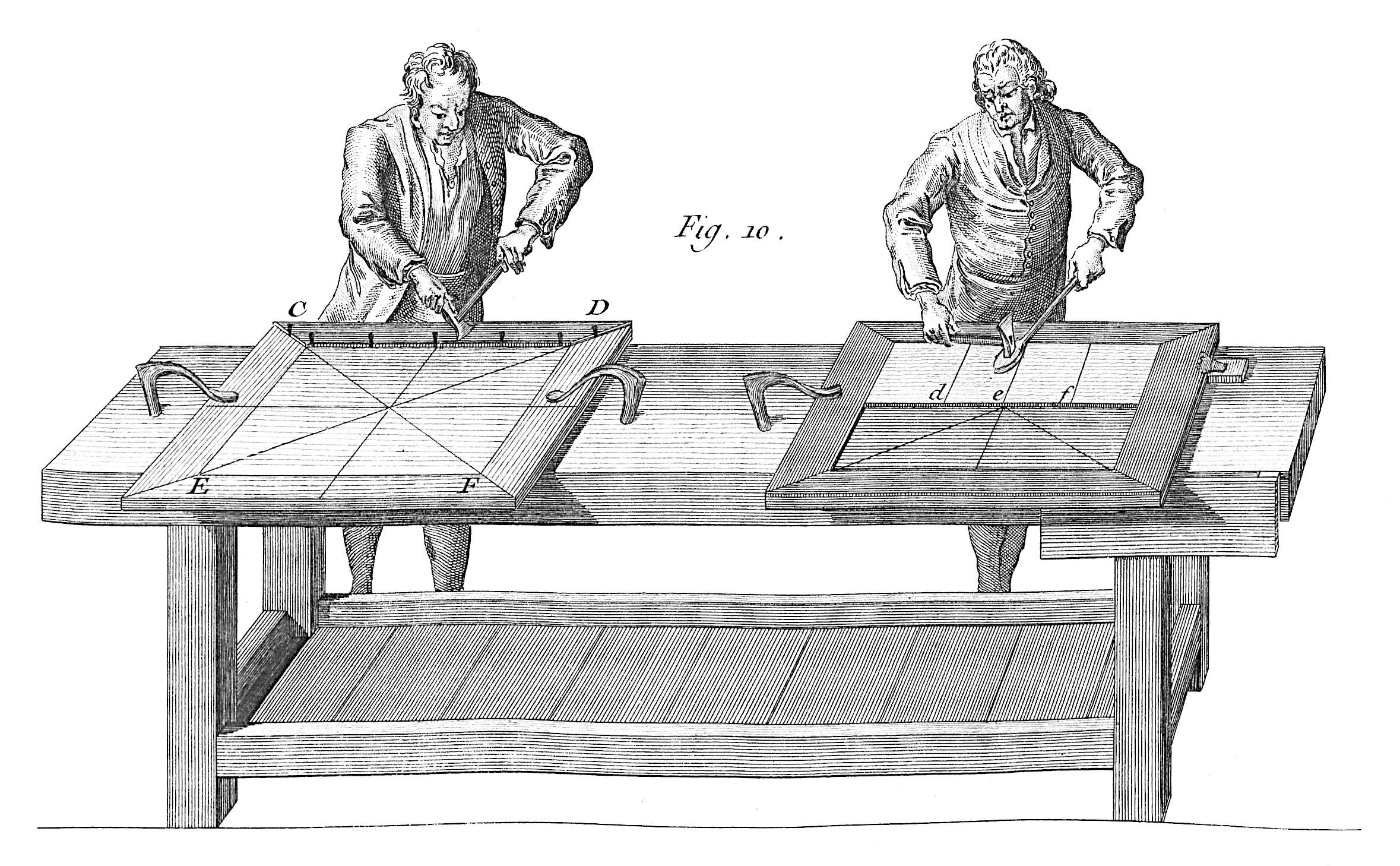
Men using veneer hammers, from L'Art du Menuisier by André Jacob Roubo

Hot hide glue is applied to the substrate, then the veneer is laid onto the glued surface. The veneer is pushed down into the glue with the wide blade, and the hammer is pushed or pulled, forcing out the excess hide glue. The sheer bulk of the metal head helps to cool the glue, causing it to grab and hold the veneer in place. The glue cures as it cools. The procedure is to work from the center, out towards the edges, forcing the hot excess glue out from under the veneer.

Often workers will apply the glue to the face of the veneer as well, using it as a lubricant for the hammer. By applying glue, therefore moisture, on both side of the veneer, the worker also reduces the curling of the veneer. This surface glue can be easily removed later, by using a cabinet scraper or cold water.

In areas where a good bond is not achieved, the glue can be reheated with a common household iron, and reactivated. The veneer can be forced into the reactivated glue using the veneer hammer, and the area where the bond was poor will become properly adhered to the substrate.

== History ==
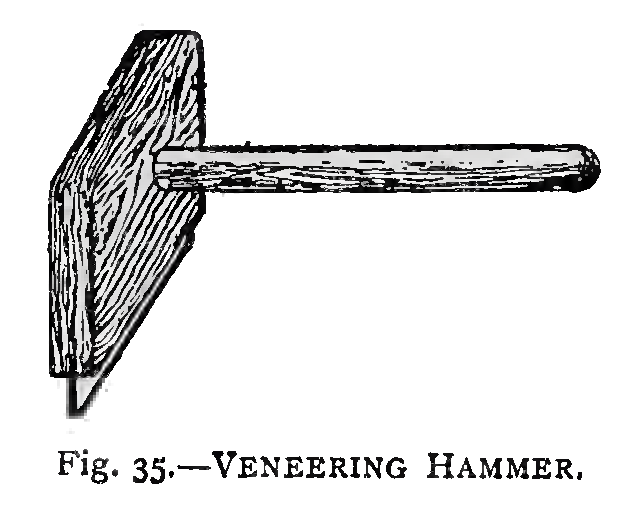
Drawing of a veneer hammer from The Cabinet Worker's Handybook (1907)

The process is centuries old, possibly dating back to Egyptian times, as examples of veneered work have survived from that era. The veneer hammer and the method of applying the veneering has been described in early European books on veneering, such as L'Art du Menuisier (1769–1775) by André Jacob Roubo.
