= Jointing =

Jointing may refer to:

- Edge jointing of a board to ensure that it is straight, square and smooth, usually prior to joining two or more boards together to create a wider board.
- Jointing the teeth of a saw blade or the edges of cutting knives, card scrapers etc.
- Jointing the mortar joints in brickwork.
- In geology jointing, refers to the formation of natural fractures in rocks.
- In agriculture, the jointing stage is that point at which the internodal tissue in the grass leaf begins to elongate, forming a stem (culm).
- In petroleum standardization, jointing refers to the process of generating joint standard test methods (STM), by two or more standardization bodies, that are technically equivalent.
- Jointing of electricity power or telecom cables
