= Jointing (sharpening) =

Pre-sharpening process of filing/grinding the teeth or cutting tool knives

Jointing refers to the process of filing or grinding the teeth or knives of cutting tools prior to sharpening. The purpose of jointing is to ensure that all surfaces to be sharpened are of a consistent size and all imperfections have been removed.

Jointing is usually the first step in the process of sharpening:

- When sharpening a hand saw blade, the teeth are jointed by running a flat file over the tips of the teeth so that they are all of the same height.
- Circular saw blades are jointed prior to sharpening so that all teeth protrude from the blade the same distance from the centre.
- Jointer knives are ground until they are all the same length prior to sharpening.
- The edges of a card scraper are jointed by running the edge over a file or a sharpening stone prior to using a burnisher to turn the burr.

Jointing is usually carried out infrequently as it removes a lot of material from the edge of the blade.
