= Bookmatching =

Matching two adjoining wood or stone surfaces

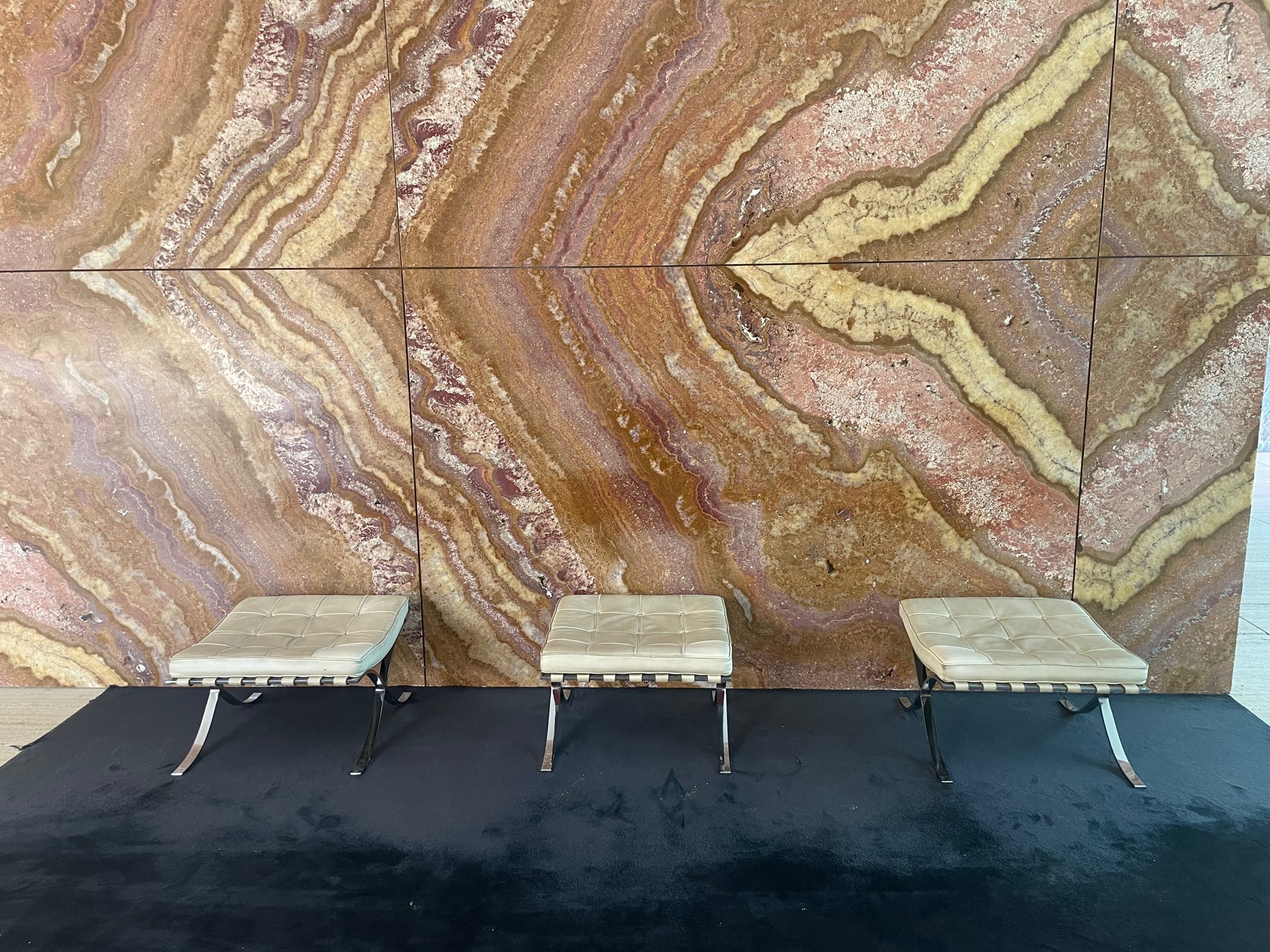
Bookmatched onyx at the Barcelona Pavilion

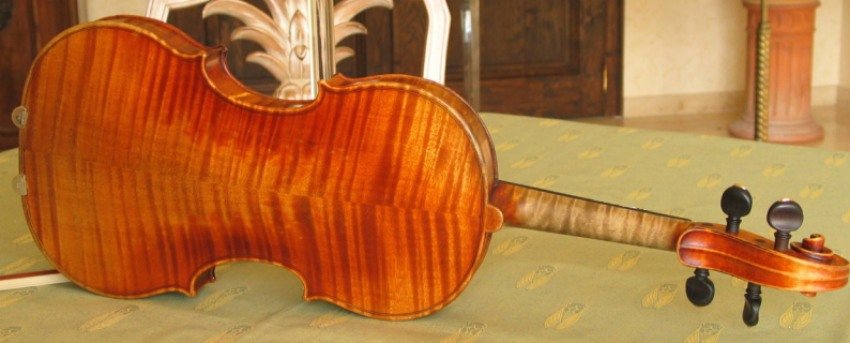
Bookmatched maple violin back. The visual match is imperfect, since the wood of a violin back is shaped with a chisel after being sawn out.

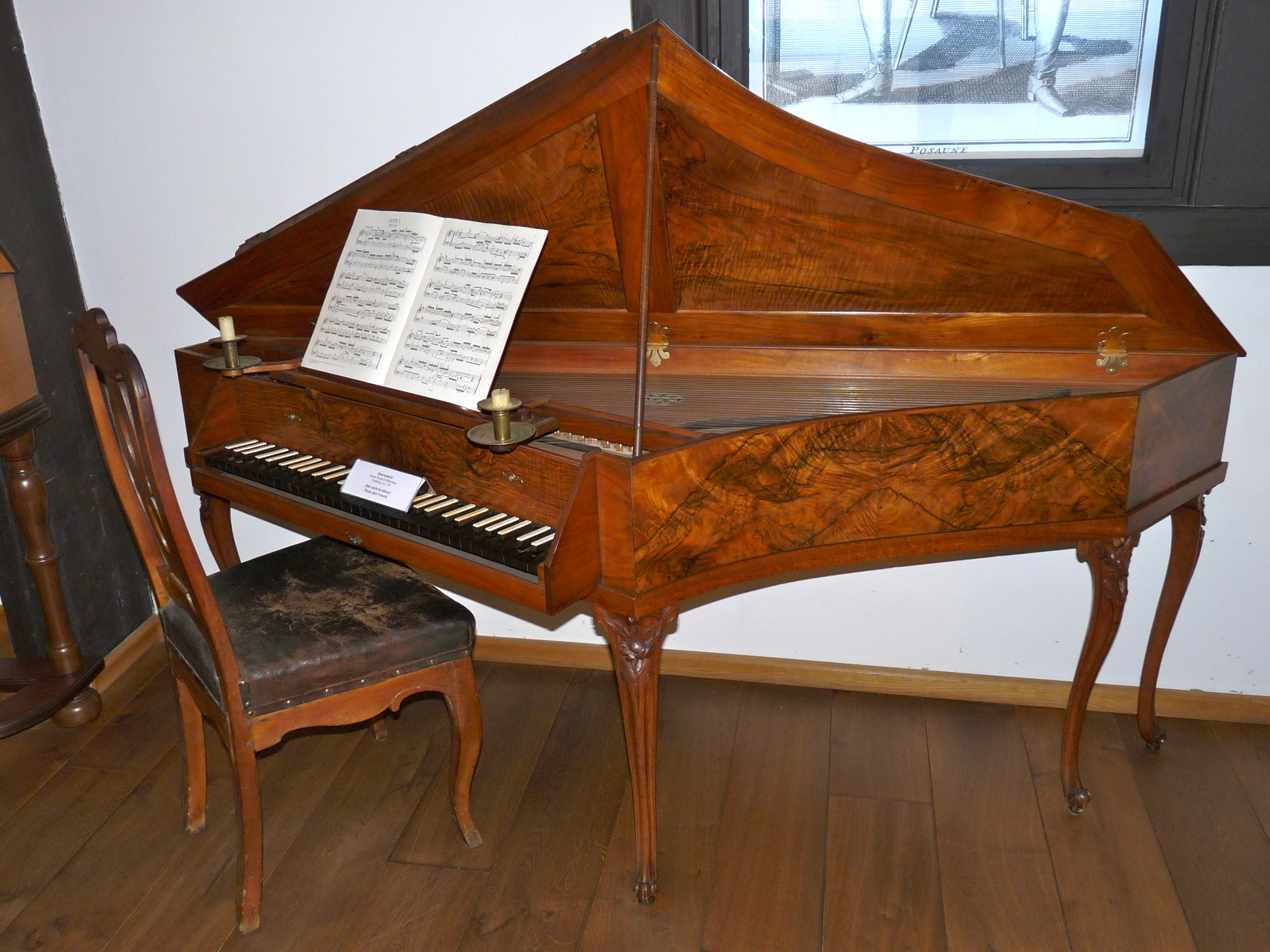
Spinet (a type of harpsichord) built in 1765 by Johann Heinrich Silbermann. Bachhaus, Eisenach, Germany. The panel to the right of the keyboard employs dramatic bookmatched veneering. Click for a clearer view.

Bookmatching is the practice of matching two (or more) wood or stone surfaces, so that two adjoining surfaces mirror each other, giving the impression of an open book.

== Overview ==
As applied to wood, bookmatching is usually done with veneer (produced in one of several ways), but can also be done with solid wood. The technique is used to beautify a variety of objects such as furniture, violins, guitars or the interior of high-luxury cars. The two adjoining surfaces are produced from the same piece of wood, so that they have (almost) exactly the same appearance, but mirrored. The final effect varies with the figure of the wood chosen and can range from extremely subtle (so that the two surfaces almost appear to be a single piece of wood), to dramatic effects with wavy grain showcased, as in high-end guitars.

Bookmatching is also possible with marble or other patterned stone.

== See also ==
- Luthier
- For another keyboard instrument adorned with bookmatched veneer, see Conrad Graf.
