= Wood veneer =

Thin slices of wood

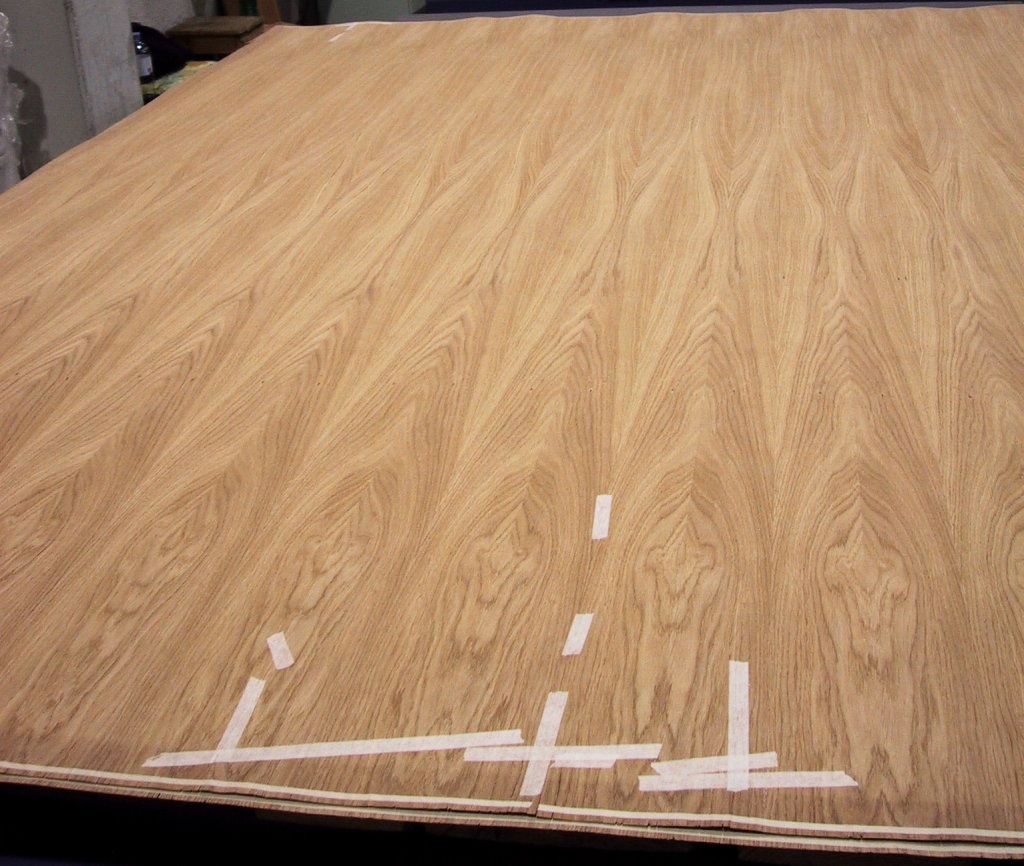
Book matched strips of veneer prior to application to a base surface

Veneer is a thin slice of wood or sometimes bark that typically is glued onto a core panel (typically, wood, particle board or medium-density fiberboard) to produce flat panels such as doors, tops and panels for cabinets, parquet flooring and parts of furniture.

Veneer is also used in marquetry. Plywood consists of three or more layers of veneer. Veneer beading is a thin layer of decorative edging placed around objects, such as jewelry boxes. Veneer is also used to replace decorative papers in high pressure laminate.

Unlike laminates, no two veneer sheets look the same.

== Background ==
Veneering dates back to at least the ancient Egyptians, who used expensive and rare wood veneers over cheaper timbers to produce their furniture and sarcophagi. During the Roman Empire, Romans also used veneered work in mass quantities.

== Production ==
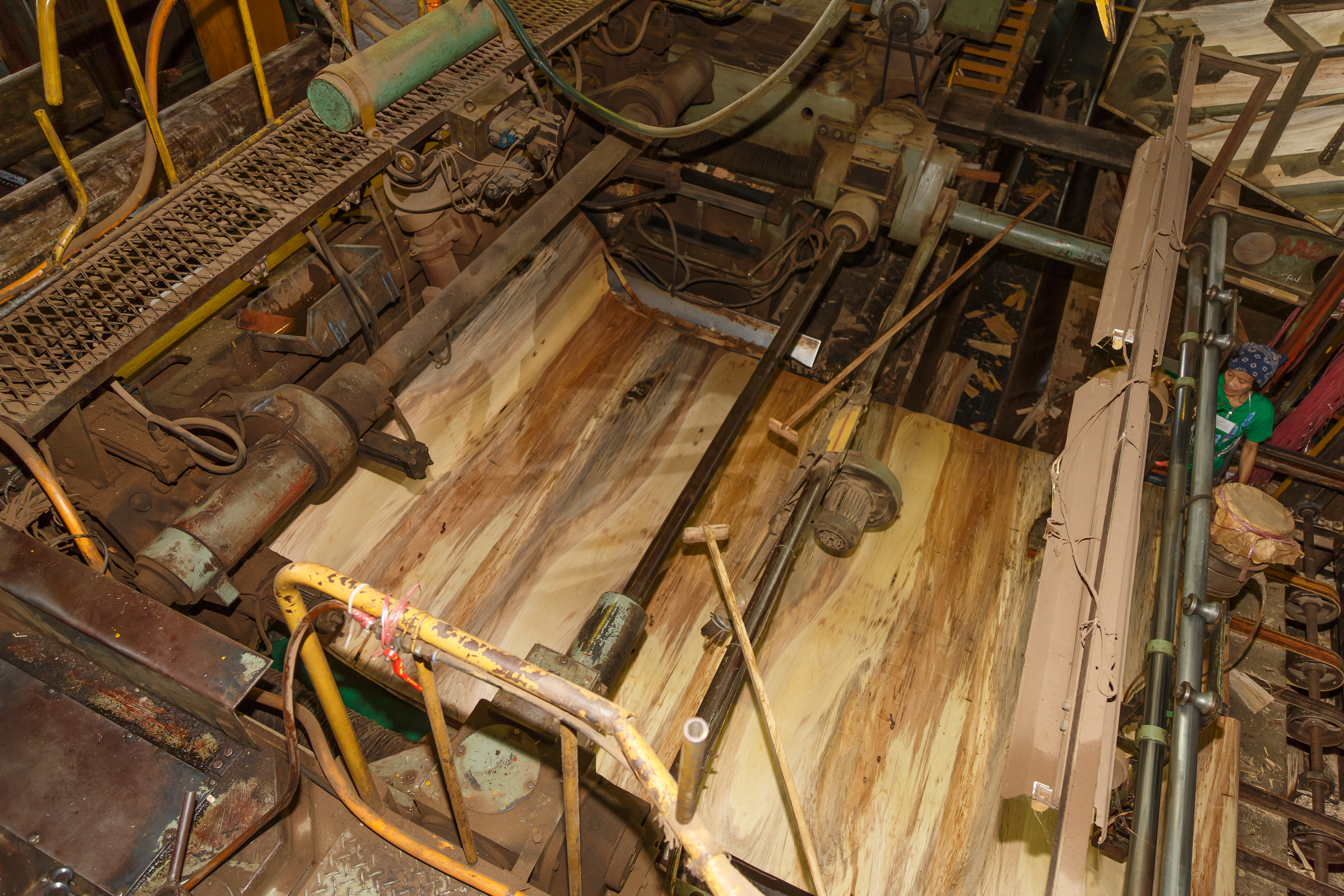
A continuous sheet of veneer coming out of a peeling rotary lathe

Veneer is obtained either by "peeling" the trunk of a tree or by slicing large rectangular blocks of wood known as flitches. The appearance of the grain and figure in wood comes from slicing through the growth rings of a tree and depends upon the angle at which the wood is sliced. There are three main types of veneer-making equipment used commercially:

- A rotary lathe in which the wood is turned against a very sharp blade and peeled off in one continuous or semi-continuous roll. Rotary-cut veneer is mainly used for plywood, as the appearance is not desirable because the veneer is cut concentric to the growth rings.
- A slicing machine in which the flitch or piece of log is raised and lowered against the blade and slices of the log are made. This yields veneer that looks like sawn pieces of wood, cut across the growth rings; such veneer is referred to as "crown cut".
- A half-round lathe in which the log or piece of log can be turned and moved in such a way as to expose the most interesting parts of the grain, creating a more textured feel and appearance; such veneer is commonly referred to as "rift cut".

Each slicing process gives a very distinctive type of grain, depending upon the tree species. In any of the veneer-slicing methods, when the veneer is sliced, a distortion of the grain occurs. As it hits the wood, the knife blade creates a "loose" side where the cells have been opened up by the blade, and a "tight" side.

Veneers are cut as thin as 0.64 mm (1/40 in). Depending on the cutting process used by the veneer manufacturer, very little wood is wasted by the saw blade thickness, known as the saw kerf. Some manufacturers use a very wide knife to slice off the thin veneer pieces. In this process, none of the wood is wasted. The slices of veneer are always kept in the order in which they are cut from the log and are often sold this way.

Historically, veneers were also sawn in approximately 3 mm (1/8 in) thick layers.

Veneer falls within the category of natural materials, hence it is called natural veneer.

== Types of veneers ==
There are a few types of veneers available, each serving a particular purpose.

- Raw veneer has no backing on it and can be used with either side facing up. The two sides will appear different when a finish has been applied due to the cell structure of the wood.
- Paper backed veneer is as the name suggests, veneers that are backed with paper. The advantage to this is it is available in large sizes, or sheets, as smaller pieces are joined prior to adding the backing. This is helpful for users that do not wish to join smaller pieces of raw veneers together. This is also helpful when veneering curves and columns as the veneer is less likely to crack.
- Phenolic backed veneer is less common and is used for composite, or artificial wood veneers. Due to concern for the natural resource, this is becoming more popular. It too has the advantage of being available in sheets, and is also less likely to crack when being used on curves.
- Laid up veneer is raw veneer that has been joined to make larger pieces. The process is time-consuming and requires great care, but is not difficult and requires no expensive tools or machinery. Veneers can be ordered through some companies already laid up to any size, shape or design.
- Reconstituted veneer is made from fast-growing tropical species. Raw veneer is cut from a log, and dyed if necessary. Once dyed, the sheets are laminated together to form a block. The block is then sliced so that the edges of the laminated veneer become the “grain” of the reconstituted veneer.
- Wood on Wood Also called 2-ply is a decorative wood veneer face with a utility grade wood backer applied at an opposing direction to the face veneer.

== See also ==
- Bookmatching
- Engineered wood
- Formaldehyde
- Multilaminar veneer
- Plywood
- Sawdust
- Veneer hammer
- Wood glue
- Wood preservative
