= Card scraper =

Woodworking shaping and finishing tool

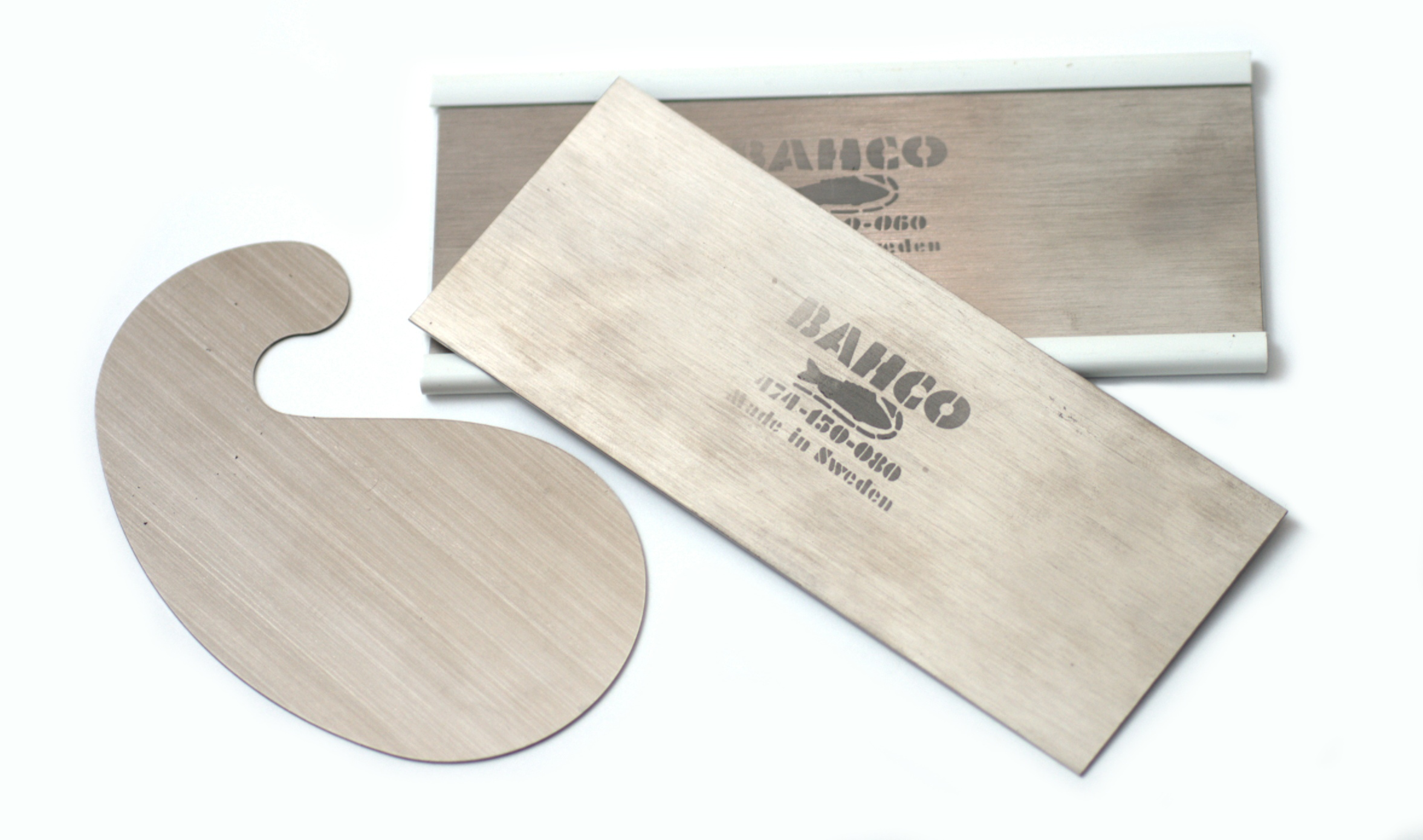
Card scrapers

A card scraper or cabinet scraper is a woodworking shaping and finishing tool. It is used to manually remove small amounts of material and excels in tricky grain areas where hand planes would cause tear out. Card scrapers are most suitable for working with hardwoods, and can be used instead of sandpaper. Scraping can produce a cleaner surface than sanding. It less often clogs the pores of the wood with dust, and may leave less torn wood fibers than sanding.

== Types ==
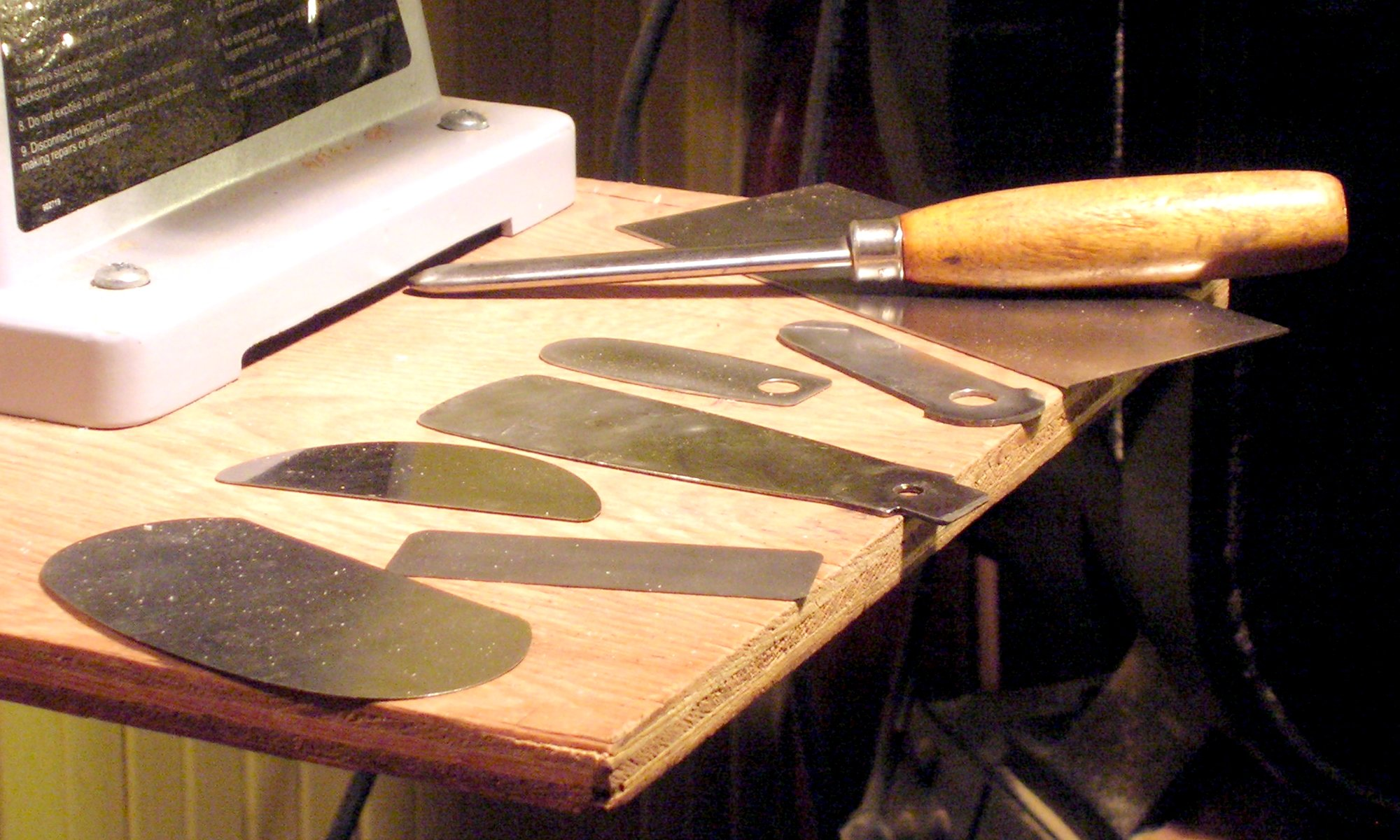
Various scrapers, with burnisher

Card scrapers are available in a range of shapes and sizes, the most common being a rectangular shape approximately 60 mm × 180 mm (2 in × 7 in) and with a thickness of 0.6 to 1.0 mm (0.024 to 0.039 in). Another common configuration is the gooseneck scraper, which has a shape resembling a french curve and is useful for scraping curved surfaces. For scraping convex shapes such as violin fingerboards, small flexible rectangular scrapers are useful.

Similarly, a card scraper can be used to manufacture complex mouldings by cutting the negative of the desired moulding into the steel, e.g. through filing or die cutting. A scratch stock is a profiled card scraper that is held in an adjustable stop.

Scrapers are normally made from high-carbon steel. There are many manufacturers who provide scrapers in a wide variety of styles. Many woodworkers prefer to make their own card scrapers by cutting them from old hand saw blades.

Card scrapers are sometimes used in working with ceramics, where they may substitute for the more traditional wooden rib. The scraper is also useful for trimming damp or dry clay. Such a scraper, the nearest one to the camera, is shown in the image at right.

== Turning the burr ==
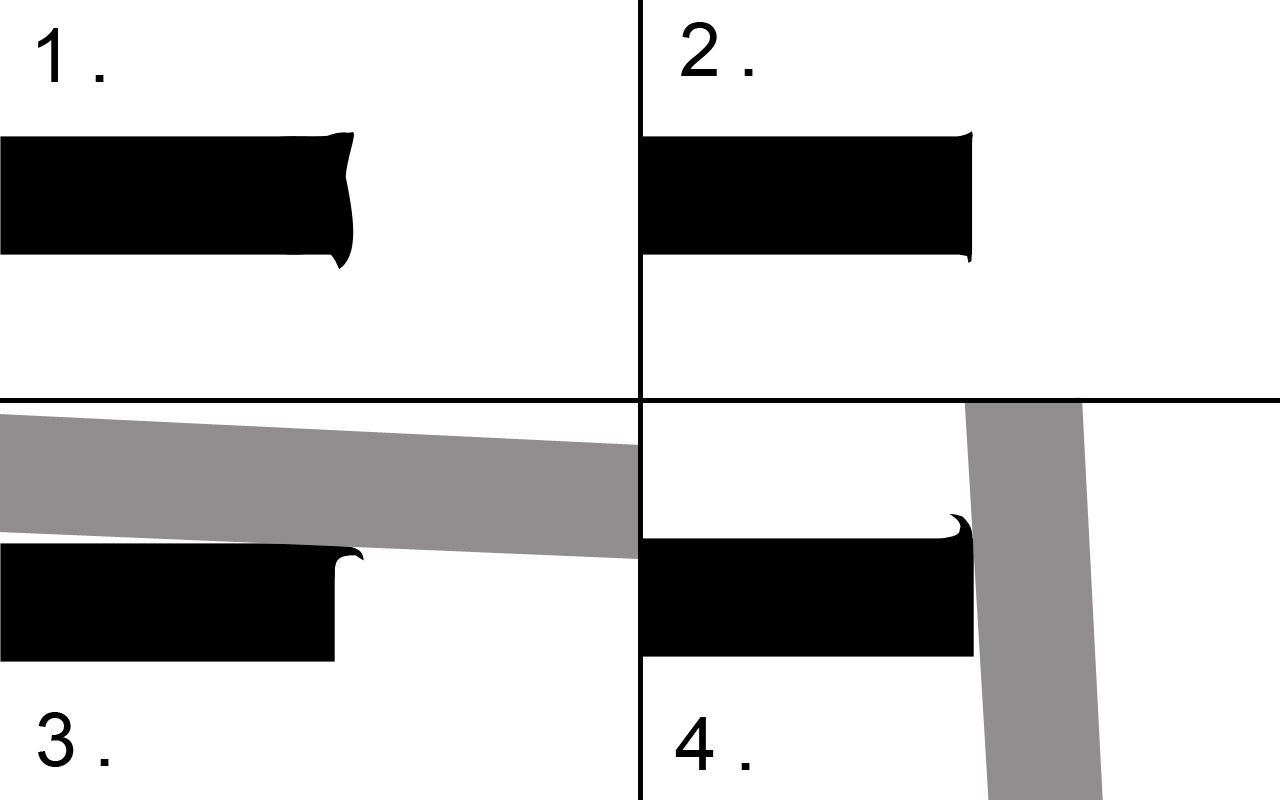
Process of sharpening: 1. Rough edge; 2. Squared (jointed) edge; 3. (Optional) first pass; 4. Turning the burr

The cutting component of a card scraper is the burred edge of the scraper. The burr is a sharp hook of metal which is turned on the edge of the scraper by burnishing with a burnisher or steel rod. A file or sharpening stone is used to joint the edge of the scraper before burnishing. Cabinet makers typically joint the edge square, or at a right angle to the face of the scraper, which allows a fine burr to be turned on both sides. Luthiers often use a beveled edge, which allows a more aggressive burr, but on one side only.

There are a number of variations in the process of turning the burr, the choice of which is down to personal preference. However the basic concept is that the burnishing rod is held against the edge of the scraper at a slight angle and drawn along the edge a number of times until the burr is created. One variation involves holding the rod flat against the side of the scraper for the first few passes to create a burr pointing away from the edge and this is then rolled back down by drawing the rod along perpendicular to the scraper.

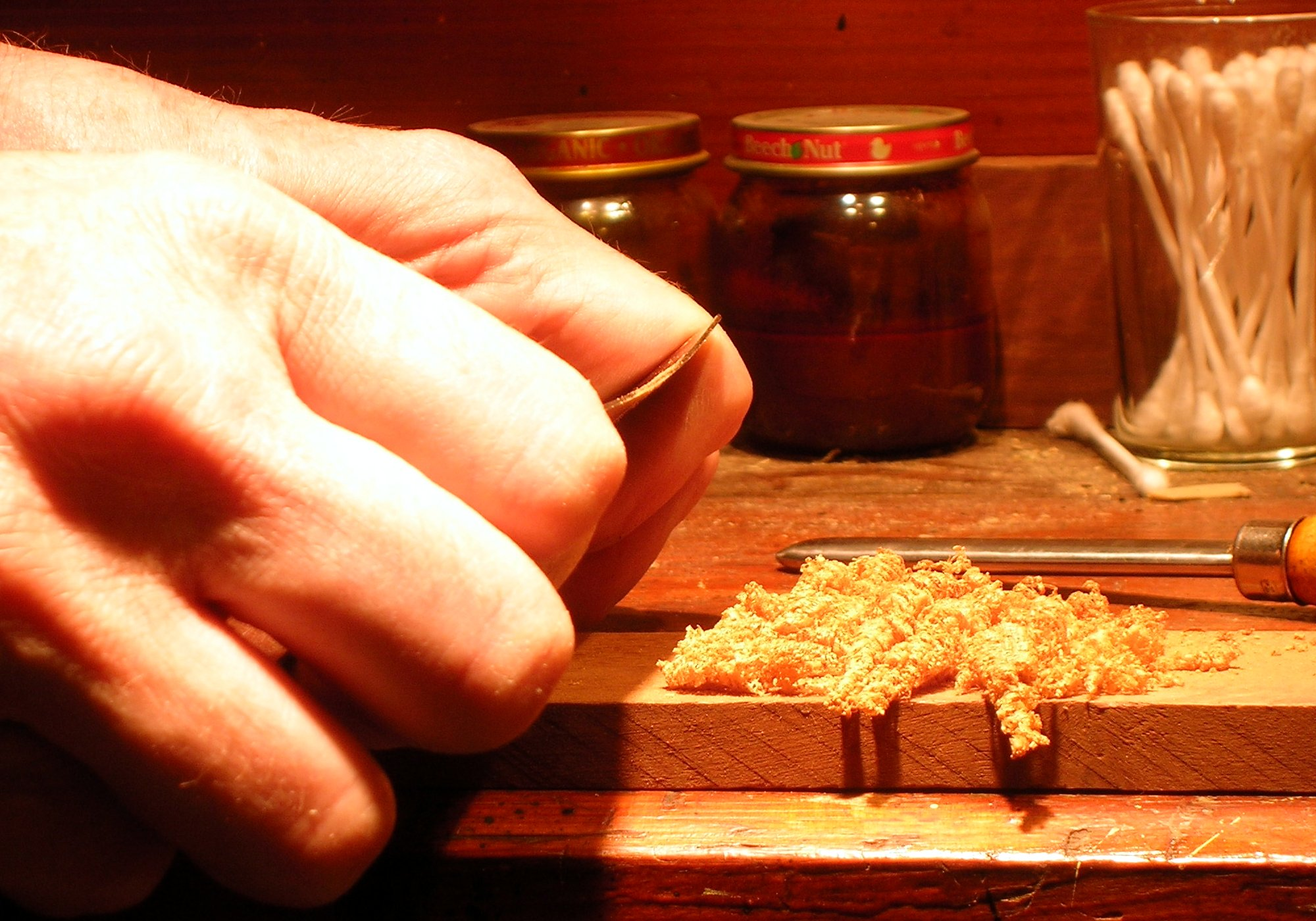
Card scraper in use, creating shavings.

With the burr properly turned, a scraper will produce miniature shavings resembling those from a plane. If only dust is produced, either the scraper is not sharp, or not being used correctly.

1. Necessary tools (burnishing rod and sharpening stone)
2,3. Cleaning-up edges
4. Jointing the edge
5. Straightening and enlargement of burr with burnishing rod
6. Turning of the burr

== Use ==
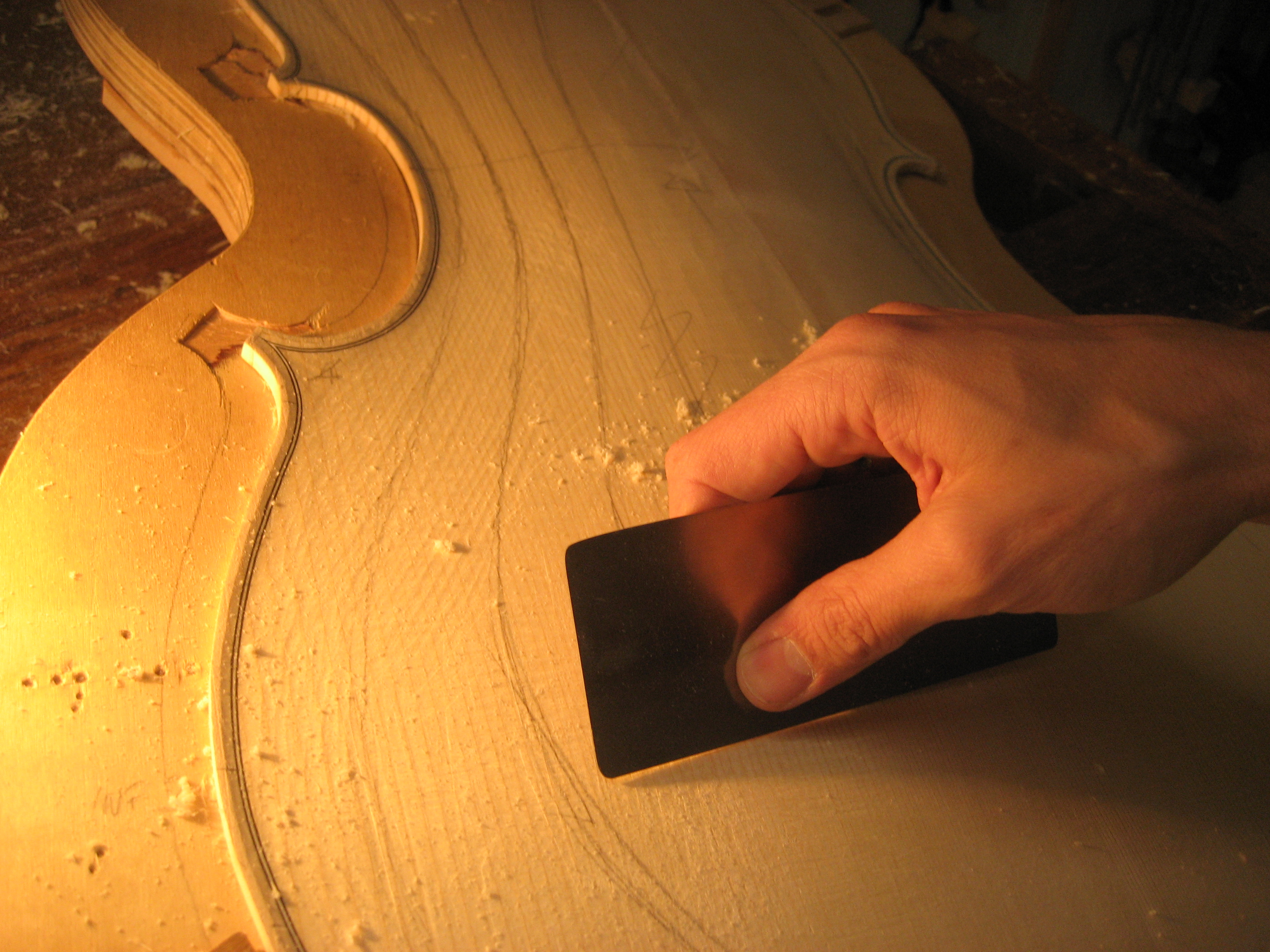
Leveling cello arching with card scraper

In use, the card scraper is held by the fingers, one hand on either side, and tilted in the direction of travel. The degree of tilt controls the effective angle of the cutting edge, which is the burr. Practice is required to find the correct angle. In addition to the tilt, the user will usually flex the scraper slightly by holding it at the edges with the fingers and pressing in the centre with the thumbs. The slight flex causes the corners of the scraper to lift slightly thus preventing them from marring the workpiece.

The scraper may be drawn towards the user or pushed away, although some woodworkers claim that pulling the scraper towards one can cause it to dip, resulting in an uneven surface.

The main drawback of a card scraper is that the usage is a difficult skill to master. It takes considerable practice to turn the burr correctly and using the scraper to work the surface in the correct fashion. Also, due to the friction created in use, the card scraper can become hot enough to burn fingers.

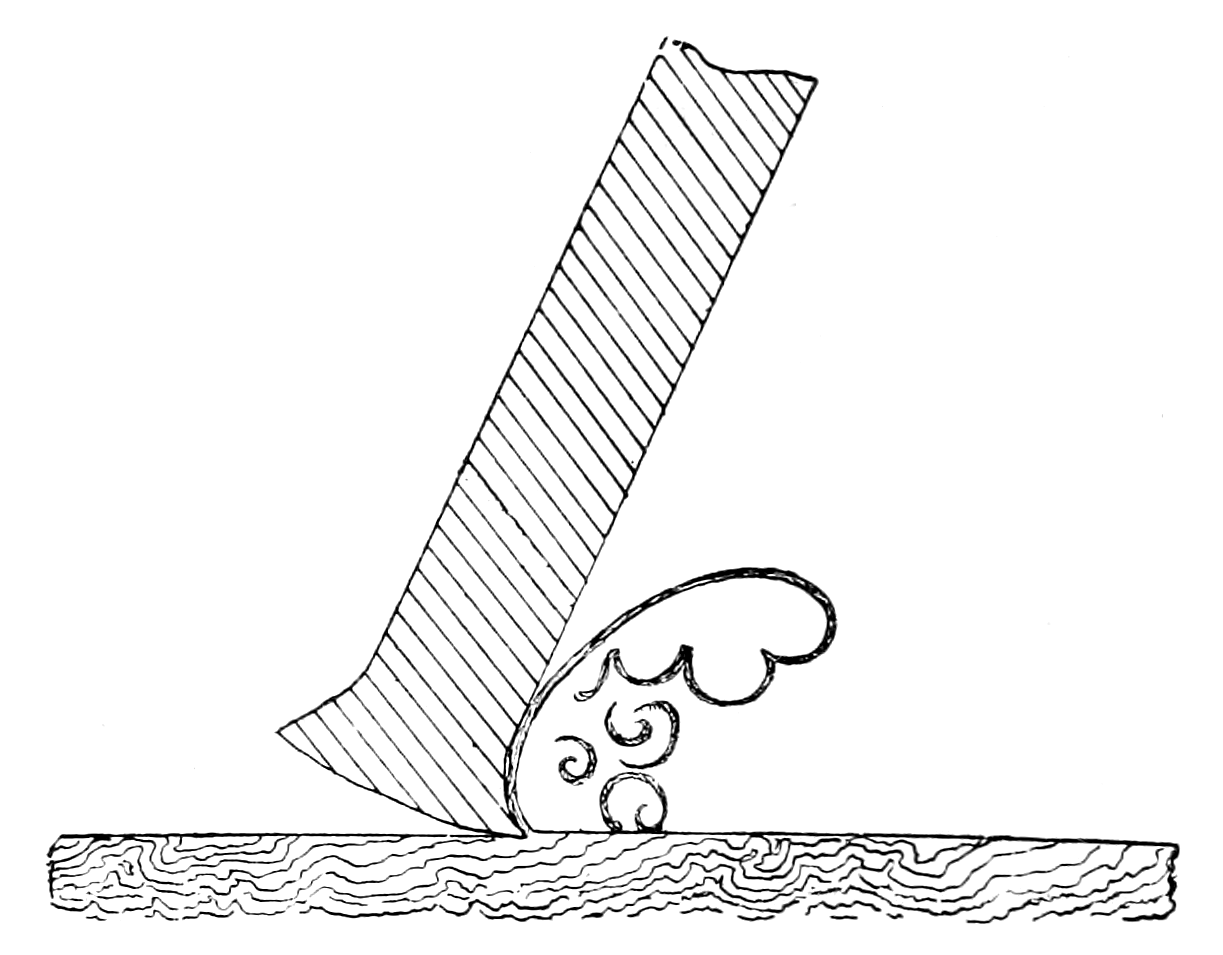
The action of the scraper against the workpiece.

Some woodworkers use the term "cabinet scraper" instead of "card scraper" for this tool. While this is widely accepted a separate tool also exists, called a cabinet scraper, which differs from the card scraper in that it has a beveled edge like a plane. Calling a card scraper a cabinet scraper could cause confusion between these tools.

A variation of the card scraper is the scraper plane which consists of a hand plane body in which a card scraper is mounted. There are also various styles of holder which can be used for this purpose. These simplify the use of the card scraper and alleviate the problems associated with heat.

Burnishing jigs and other accessories are available to assist in turning the burr, which makes the card scraper more accessible to the novice.
