= Mies van der Rohe Foundation =

Public arts entity in Barcelona, Spain

The Mies van der Rohe Foundation is a non-profit public entity created with the aim of reconstructing the Barcelona Pavilion that the German architect Ludwig Mies van der Rohe and designer Lilly Reich created for the German entry of the 1929 Barcelona International Exposition.

The temporary pavilion was demolished in 1930 after the exposition finished. In 1959 the architect Oriol Bohigas asked Mies van der Rohe for permission to rebuild the Pavilion, and in 1983 work began with the team of architects Ignasi de Solà-Morales, Cristian Cirici, and Fernando Ramos, in collaboration with Arthur Drexler and the Mies van der Rohe archive at MoMA. The present building was inaugurated in 1986.

== Activities ==
In addition to ensuring the preservation of one of the pioneering works of modern architecture, the Mies van der Rohe Foundation aims to deepen the debate on modern and contemporary architecture and urban planning, create a documentary archive on Ludwig Mies van der Rohe and promote the study of the architect.

Another of the Foundation's focuses is on the analysis and study of Mediterranean cities through collaboration with institutions and universities in the Mediterranean basin.

=== European Union Prize for Contemporary Architecture – Mies van der Rohe Award ===
The awarding of the European Union Prize for Contemporary Architecture – Mies van der Rohe Award is a key function of the organisation 'to acknowledge and reward quality architectural production in Europe.' The Mies van der Rohe Foundation produces a travelling exhibition with the results of each edition of the Prize and a catalogue.

=== Lilly Reich Grant ===
The foundation also awards the Lilly Reich Grant for equality in architecture. The grant promotes the study and promotion of the contributions in architecture by figures that have been overlooked, forgotten or made by professionals, who have suffered discrimination due to their personal conditions.

=== Docomomo ===
Between 2010 – 2014, the Mies van der Rohe Foundation served as the headquarters of Docomomo International, an international organisation dedicated to the documentation and conservation of buildings of the Modern Movement.

== Board of Directors ==
The Board of Directors of the Foundation is composed of:

- City Council of Barcelona
- Ministry of Development
- Department of Territory and Sustainability of the Generalitat of Catalonia
- Barcelona Free Trade Zone Consortium
- College of Architects of Catalonia
- Barcelona Fair
- Barcelona School of Architecture
- Museum of Modern Art, New York
- Prussian Cultural Heritage Foundation, Berlin

== Publications ==
- European Union Prize for Contemporary Architecture – Mies van der Rohe Award 2009, ACTAR, 2009, Barcelona
- de Solà-Morales, Ignasi; Cirici, Cristian; Ramos, Fernando (1993). Mies van der Rohe: Barcelona Pavilion. Barcelona: Gustavo Gili. ISBN 8425216079.
