= Barcelona Pavilion =

1929 building by Mies van der Rohe

- Pabellón Alemán (in Spanish); Pavelló Alemany (in Catalan)
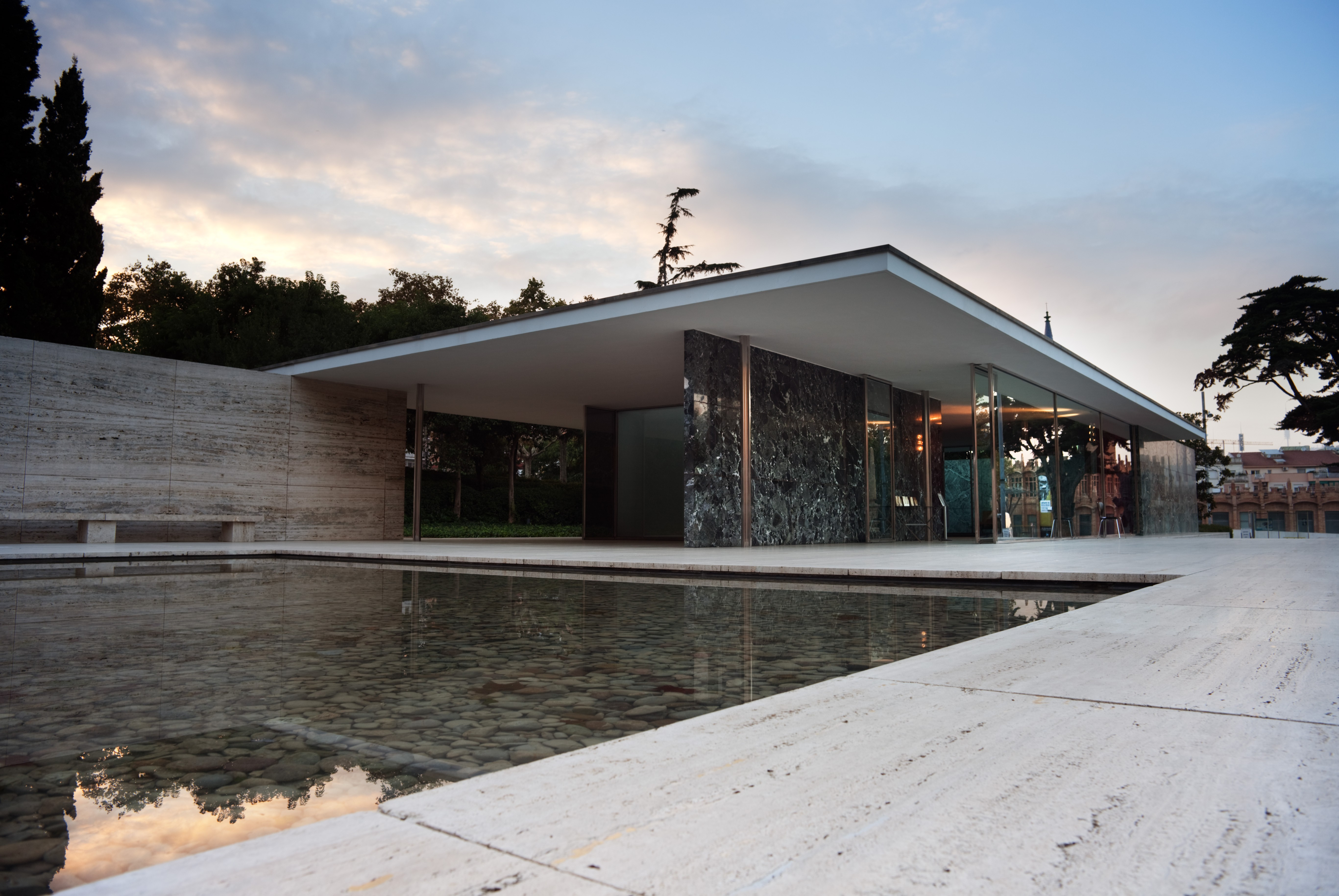
- Interactive map of the Barcelona Pavilion area
- Alternative names: German Pavilion

General information
- Type: Exhibition building
- Architectural style: Modernism, Minimalism
- Location: Barcelona, Catalonia, Spain
- Coordinates: 41°22′14″N 2°09′00″E
- Construction started: 1928
- Completed: 1929
- Inaugurated: 27 May 1929
- Demolished: 1930 (rebuilt replica in 1986)
- Client: Government of Germany

Technical details
- Structural system: Steel frame with glass and polished stone

Design and construction
- Architects: Ludwig Mies van der Rohe and Lilly Reich

Website
- miesbcn.com

The Barcelona Pavilion (Catalan: Pavelló alemany; Spanish: Pabellón alemán; "German Pavilion") is a structure designed by Ludwig Mies van der Rohe and Lilly Reich. It was originally built as the German Pavilion for the 1929 International Exposition in Barcelona, Catalonia, Spain. This building was used for the official opening of the German section of the exhibition. It is an important building in the history of modern architecture, known for its simple form and its use of expensive materials, such as marble, red onyx, and travertine. The original structure was demolished in 1930, and it was reconstructed in 1986. Furnishings specifically designed for the building, including the Barcelona chair, are still in production, and the structure has inspired many important modernist buildings.

== Concept ==
Mies and Reich were offered the commission of this building in 1928 after his successful administration of the 1927 Deutscher Werkbund exhibition in Stuttgart. The German Republic entrusted Mies with the artistic management and erection of not only the Barcelona Pavilion, but for the buildings for all the German sections at the 1929 International Exhibition. However, Mies had severe time constraints—he had to design the Barcelona Pavilion in less than a year—and was also dealing with uncertain economic conditions.

In the years following World War I, Germany started to turn around. The economy started to recover after the 1924 Dawes Plan. The pavilion for the International Exhibition was supposed to represent the new Weimar Germany: democratic, culturally progressive, prospering, and thoroughly pacifist; a self-portrait through architecture. The Commissioner, Georg von Schnitzler said it should give "voice to the spirit of a new era". This concept was carried out with the realization of the "free plan" and the "floating roof".

== Building ==
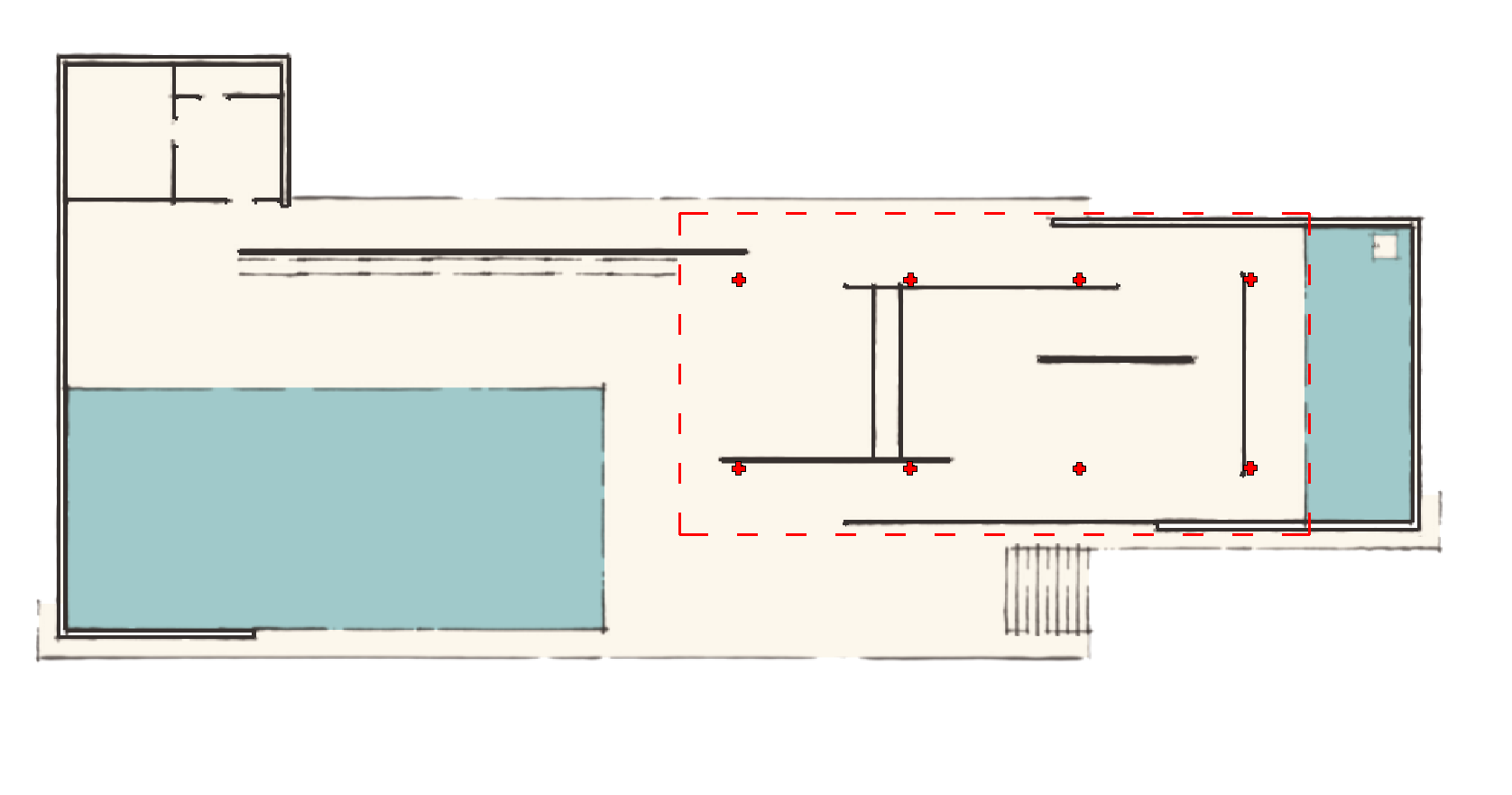
Plan of the Barcelona Pavilion

Mies's response to the proposal by Georg von Schnitzler was radical. After rejecting the original site for aesthetic reasons, Mies agreed to a quiet site at the narrow side of a wide, diagonal axis, where the pavilion would still offer viewpoints and a route leading to one of the exhibition's main attractions, the Poble Espanyol.

The pavilion was to be bare, with no exhibits, leaving only the structure accompanying a single sculpture and specially designed furniture (the Barcelona Chair). This lack of accommodation enabled Mies to treat the Pavilion as a continuous space; blurring inside and outside. "The design was predicated on an absolute distinction between structure and enclosure—a regular grid of cruciform steel columns interspersed by freely spaced planes". However, the structure was more of a hybrid style, some of these planes also acted as supports. The floor plan is very simple. The entire building rests on a plinth of travertine. A southern U-shaped enclosure, also of travertine, helps form a service annex and a large water basin. The floor slabs of the pavilion project out and over the pool—once again connecting inside and out. Another U-shaped wall on the opposite side of the site also forms a smaller water basin. This is where the statue by Georg Kolbe sits. The roof plates, relatively small, are supported by the chrome-clad, cruciform columns. This gives the impression of a hovering roof. Robin Evans said that the reflective columns appear to be struggling to hold the "floating" roof plane down, not to be bearing its weight.

External image
- Photograph of the original Barcelona Pavilion, 1929

Mies wanted this building to become "an ideal zone of tranquillity" for the weary visitor, who should be invited into the pavilion on the way to the next attraction. Since the pavilion lacked a real exhibition space, the building itself was to become the exhibit. The pavilion was designed to "block" any passage through the site, rather, one would have to go through the building. Visitors would enter by going up a few stairs, and due to the slightly sloped site, would leave at ground level in the direction of the Poble Espanyol. The visitors were not meant to be led in a straight line through the building, but to take continuous turnabouts. The walls not only created space, but also directed visitor's movements. This was achieved by wall surfaces being displaced against each other, running past each other, and creating a space that became narrower or wider.

Another unique feature of this building is the exotic materials Mies chooses to use. Plates of high-grade stone materials like veneers of Tinos verde antico marble and golden onyx as well as tinted glass of grey, green, white, as well as translucent glass, perform exclusively as spatial dividers.

Because this was planned as an exhibition pavilion, it was intended to exist only temporarily. The building was torn down in early 1930, not even a year after it was completed.

== Reconstruction ==
Between 1983 and 1986, a group of Catalan architects formed the Mies van der Rohe Foundation and reconstructed the pavilion permanently, based on historical drawings and rediscovered footings on the site. The reconstruction has been a popular tourist destination, but it also has been controversial among architects, critics, and historians. Some have hailed it as a revived masterpiece, some have condemned it as a "fake", and others are ambivalent. "[T]his building is not supposed to exist," asserted Paul Goldberger at the time. During planning, Philip Johnson wondered, "The problem before us is should a dream be realized or not? We have made such a myth of that building. Shouldn't it be left in the sacred vault of the memory bank?" Architect Lance Hosey has thoroughly documented reactions to the reconstruction, concluding that while the reconstruction is a better physical artifact, the original was an irreplaceable product of its sociopolitical context.

== Sculpture ==
The Pavilion was not only a pioneer for construction forms with a new understanding of space, but also for modelling new opportunities for an association of free art and architecture. Mies placed Georg Kolbe's Alba ("Dawn") in the small water basin, leaving the larger one all the more empty. The sculpture also ties into the highly reflective materials Mies used—he chose the place where these optical effects would have the strongest impact; the building offers multiple views of Alba. "From now on, in the sense of equality for juxtaposing building and visual work, sculptures were no longer to be applied retrospectively to the building, but rather to be a part of the spatial design, to help define and interpret it. To the day, one of the most notable examples is the Barcelona Pavilion".

== Interventions programme ==
Since the Pavilion's reconstruction in the 1980s, the Mies van der Rohe Foundation has invited leading artists and architects to temporarily alter the Pavilion. These installations and alterations, called "interventions", have kept the pavilion as a node of debate on architectural ideas and practices. The list of invited people includes architects Kazuyo Sejima and Ryue Nishizawa (SANAA) who added spiral acrylic interior walls, artist Ai Weiwei who refilled two pools with coffee and milk, Andrés Jaque who revealed the pavilion's so far disregarded basement and its role in hiding the daily making of the site's experience, Enric Miralles, Antoni Muntadas who brought to the pavilion the smell of the MoMA archives where its memory is preserved and Jordi Bernadó who removed the pavilion's glass doors. The architect and activist Andrés Jaque (Office for Political Innovation), artists Katarzyna Krakowiak, Laura Martínez de Guereñu, and the designer Sabine Marcelis have also been commissioned to create pieces for the interventions programme.

== Lilly Reich Grant for equality in architecture ==
In 2018, the Mies van der Rohe Foundation presented the first edition of the Lilly Reich Grant for equality in architecture. The recipient of the inaugural grant was Re-enactment: Lilly Reich's work occupies the Barcelona Pavilion submitted by Laura Martínez de Guereñu. In 2020, the second grant was awarded to [On Set with] Lilly Reich submitted by Laura Lizondo Sevilla, Débora Domingo Calabuig, and Avelina Prat García. The third grant, in 2022, was awarded to the submission Anna Bofill Levi. Architecture as a Counter-Melody (1977–1996) by María-Elia Gutiérrez Mozo, José Parra Martínez, Ana Gilsanz Díaz, and Joaquín Arnau Amo.

== Gallery ==
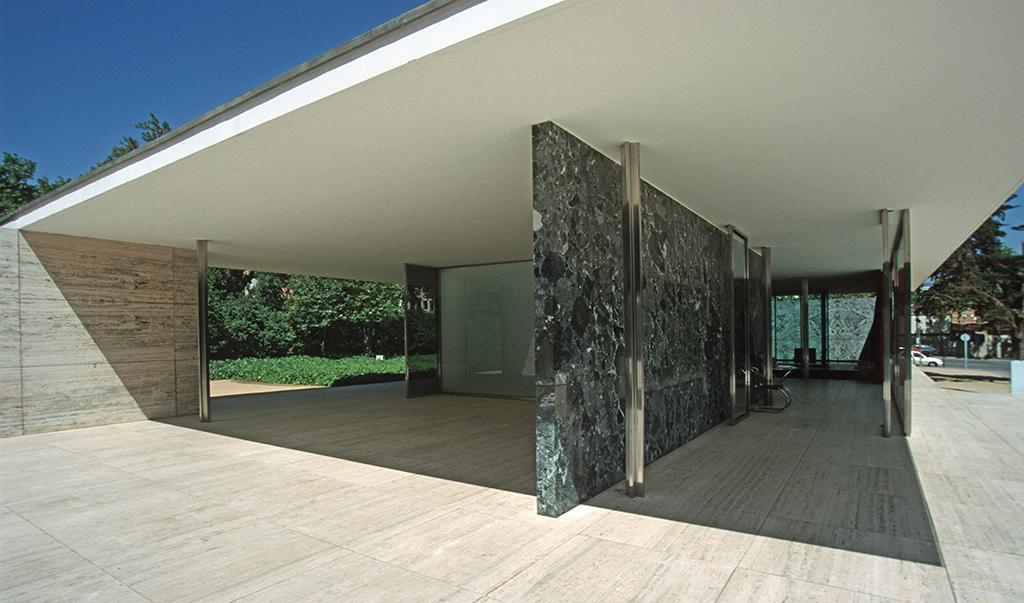
Barcelona Pavilion (reconstruction)

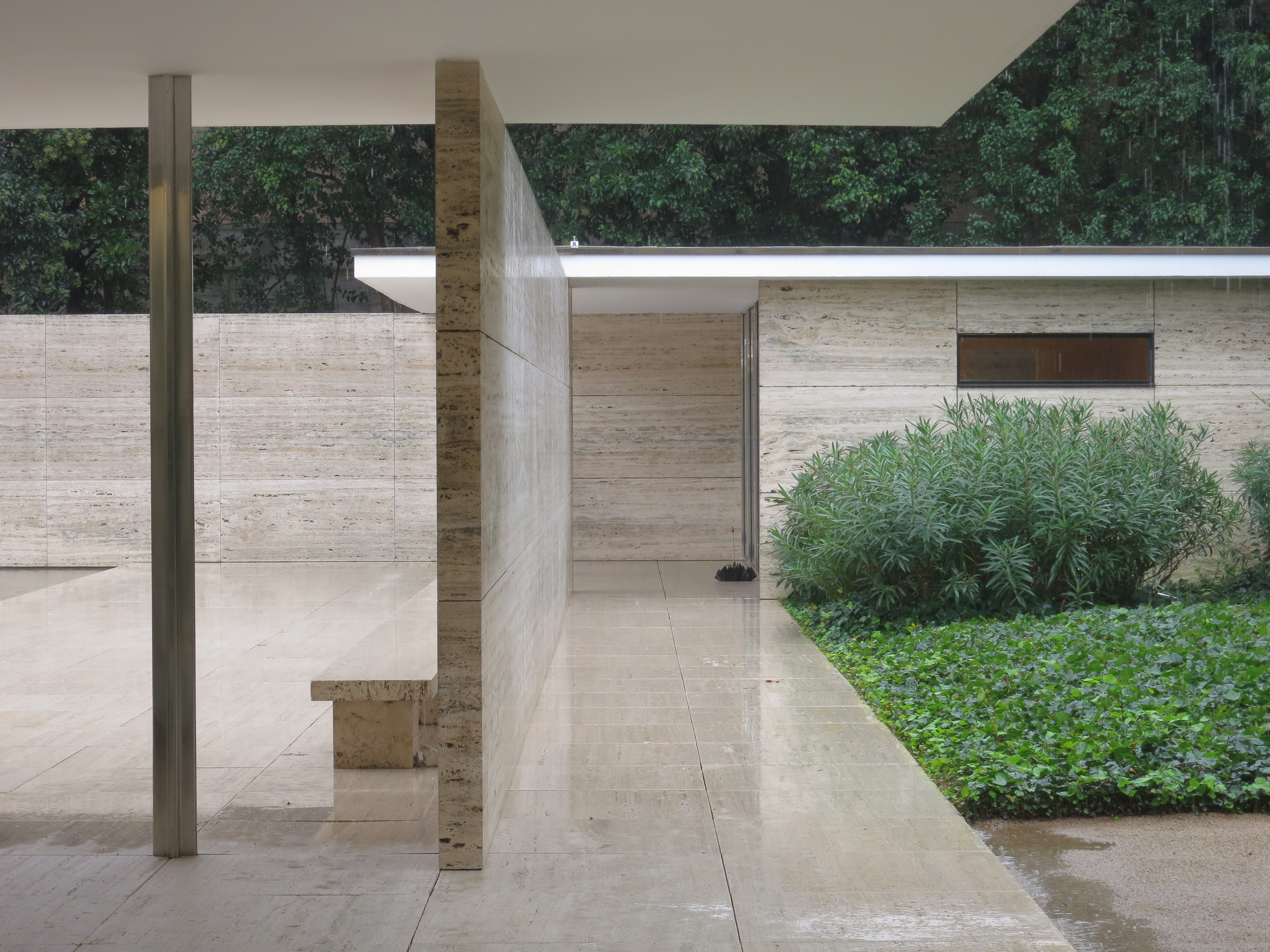
View towards annex showing cantilevered roof-slabs

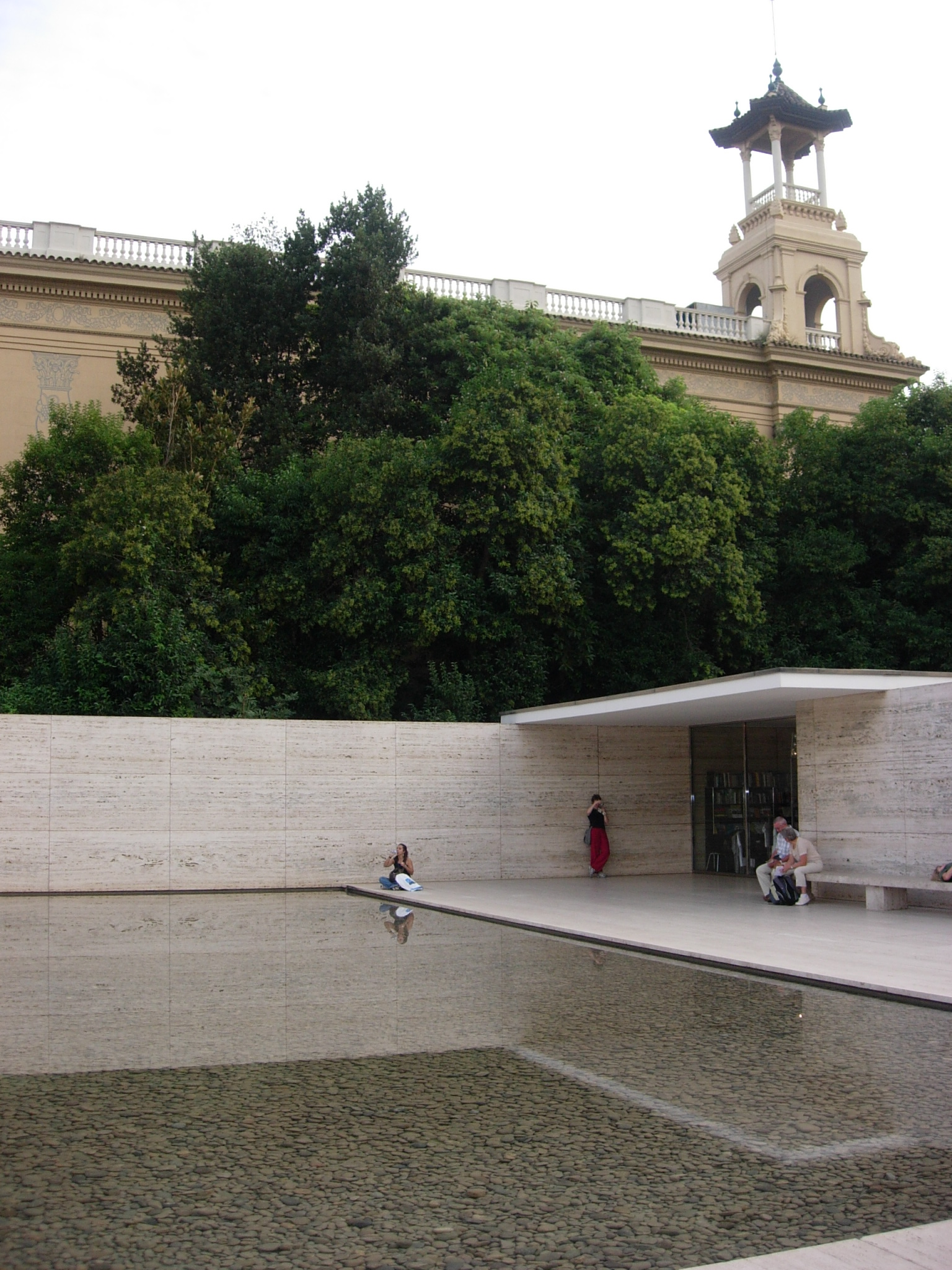
Another view showing annex and large reflecting pool

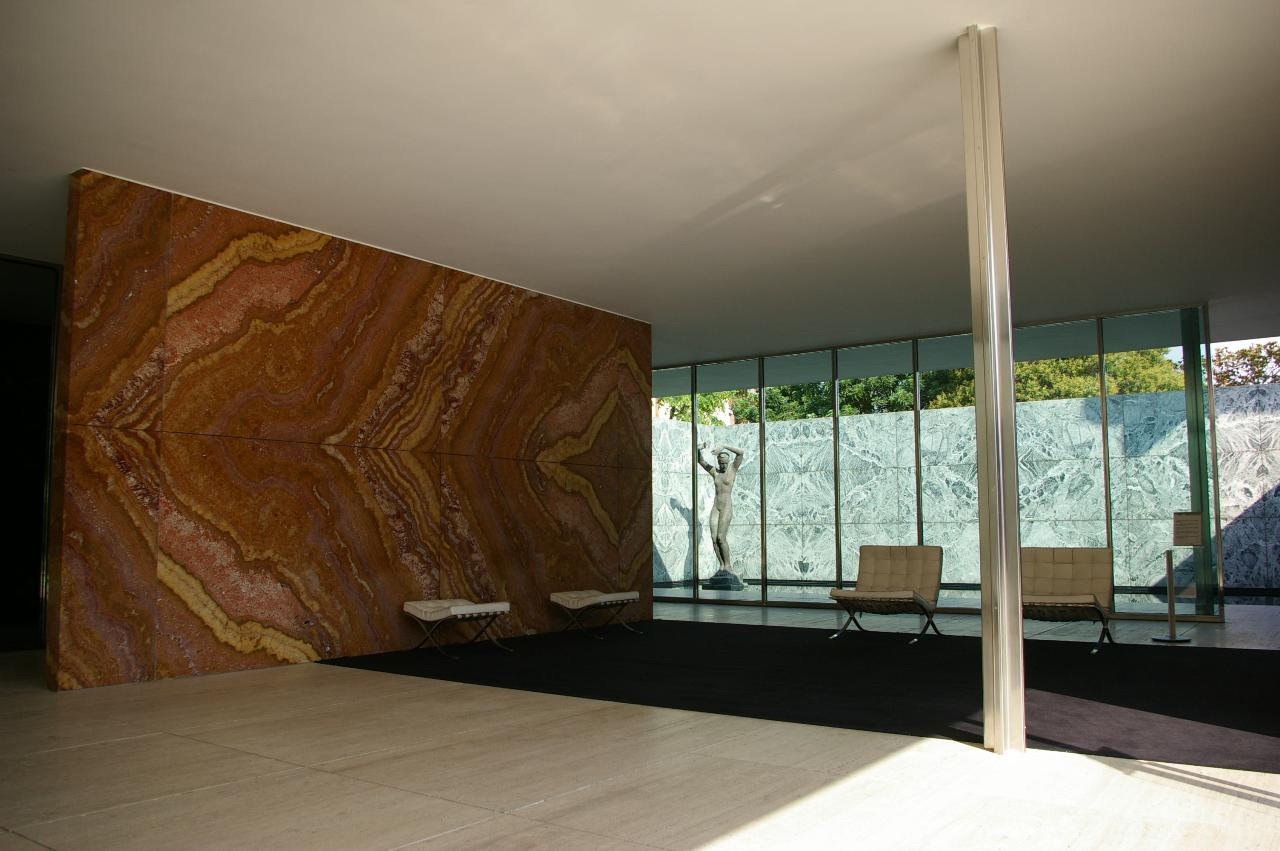
View showing the cruciform steel columns

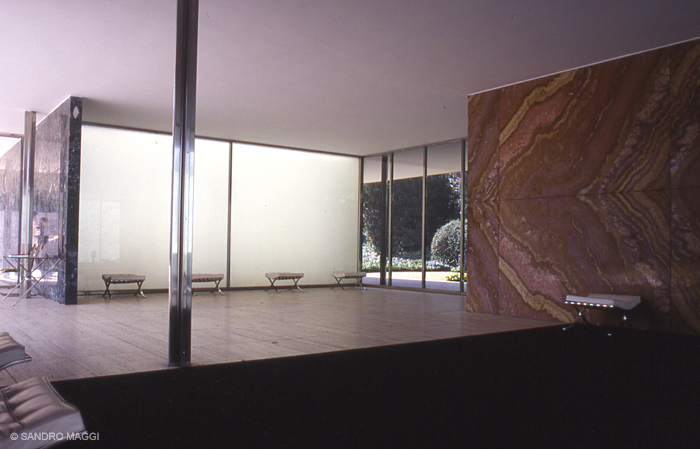
Another view

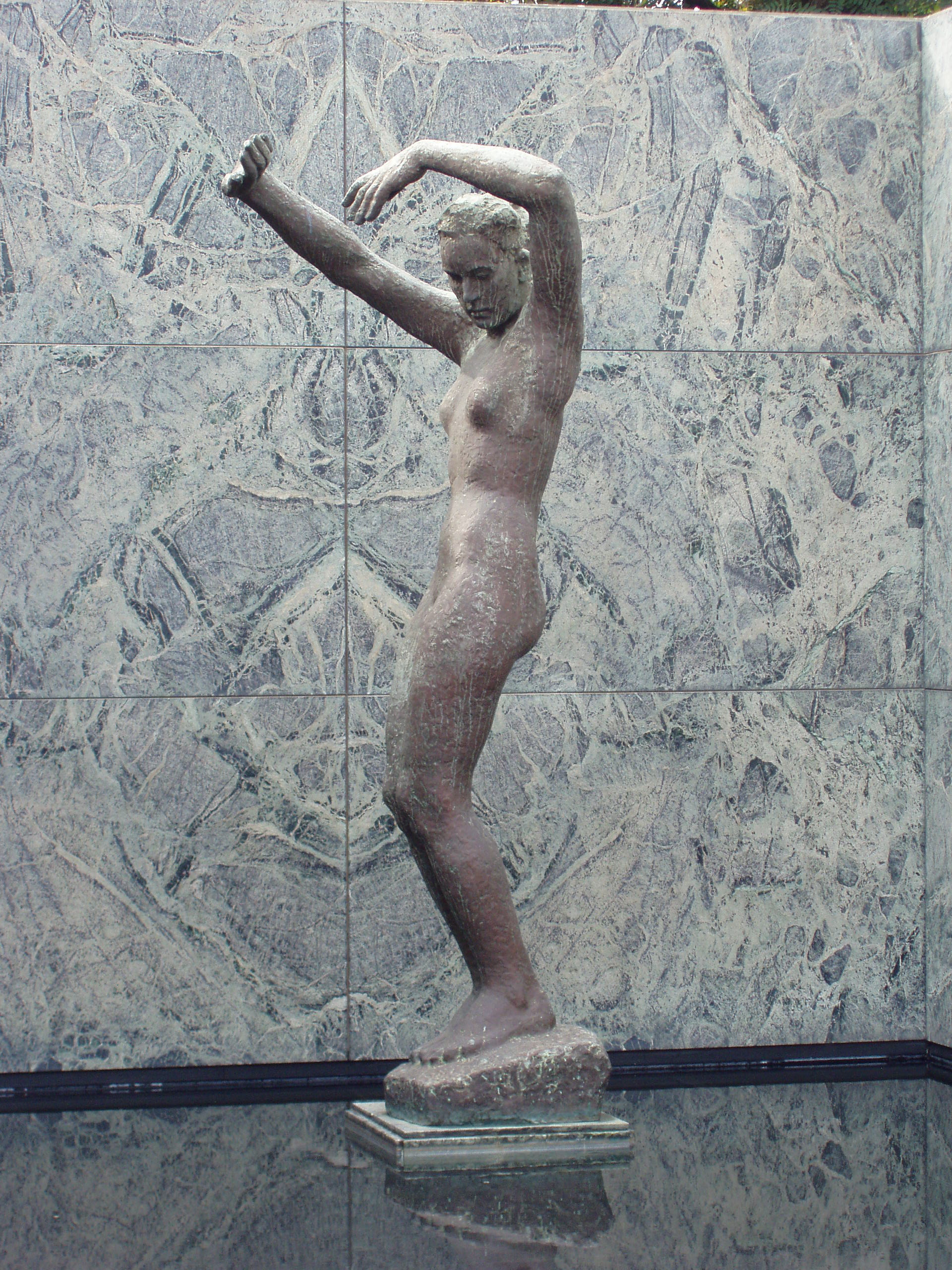
Dawn (Der Morgen) by Georg Kolbe

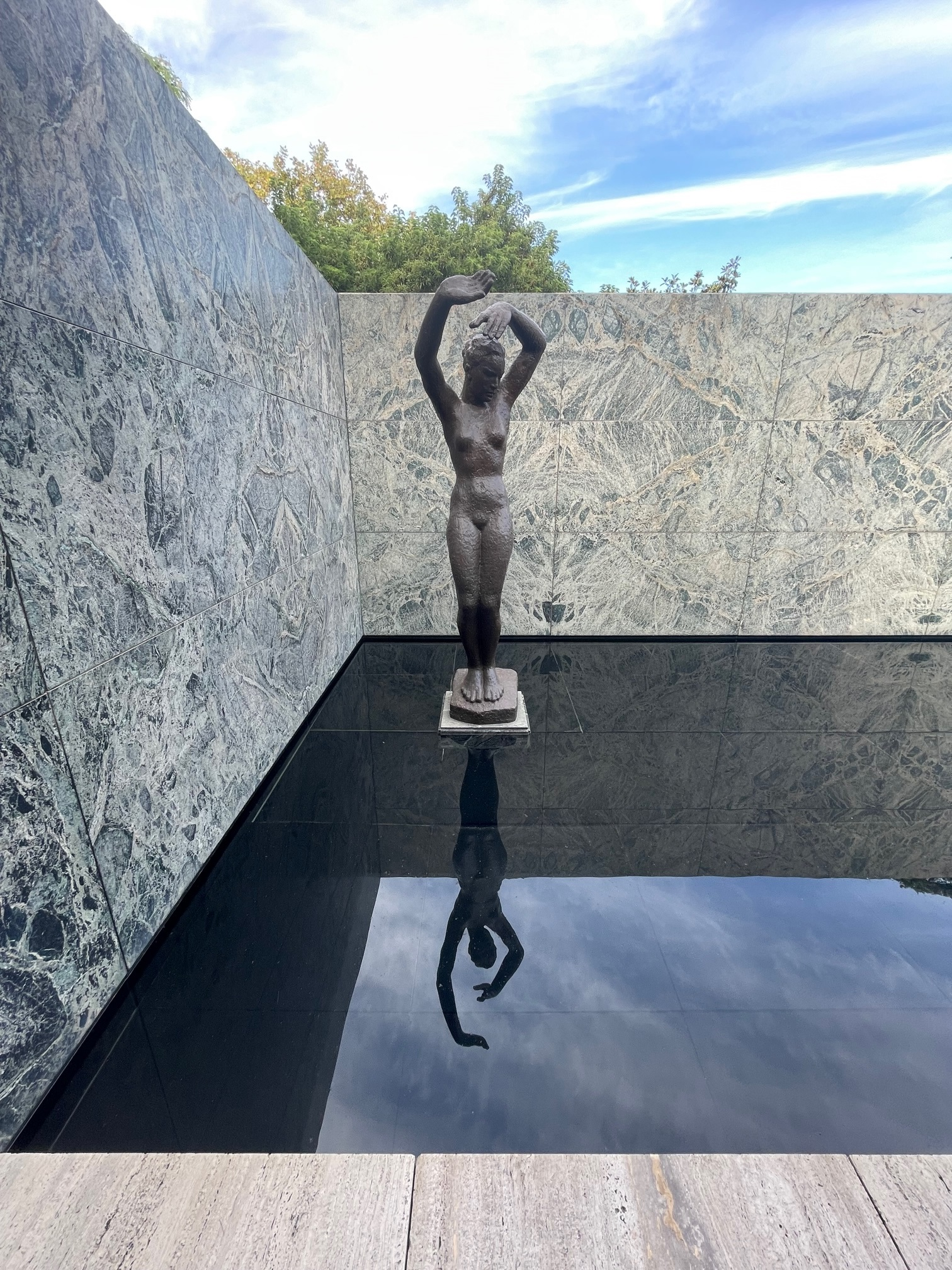
View showing small reflecting pool

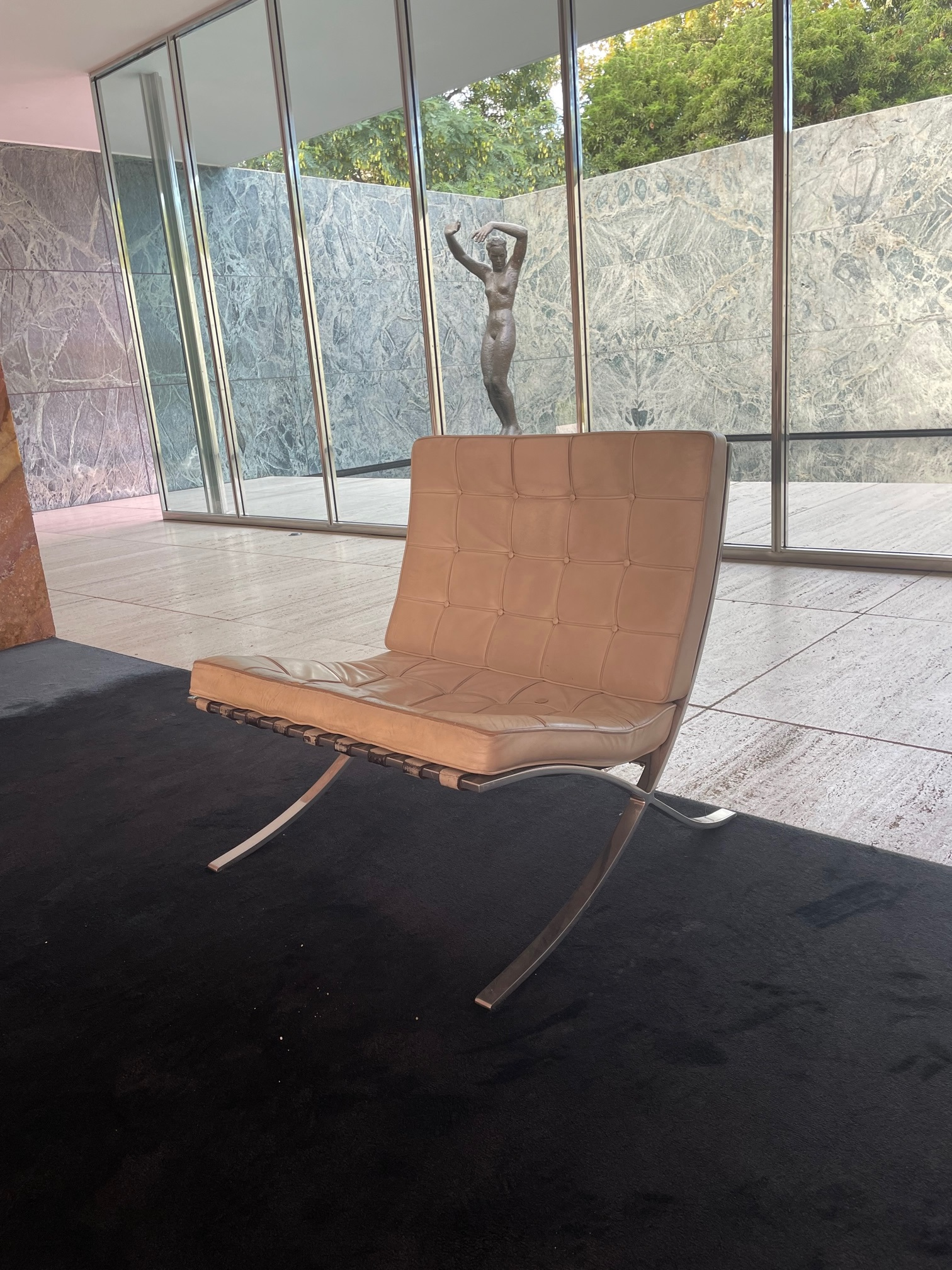
Barcelona Chair (Dawn sculpture in background)

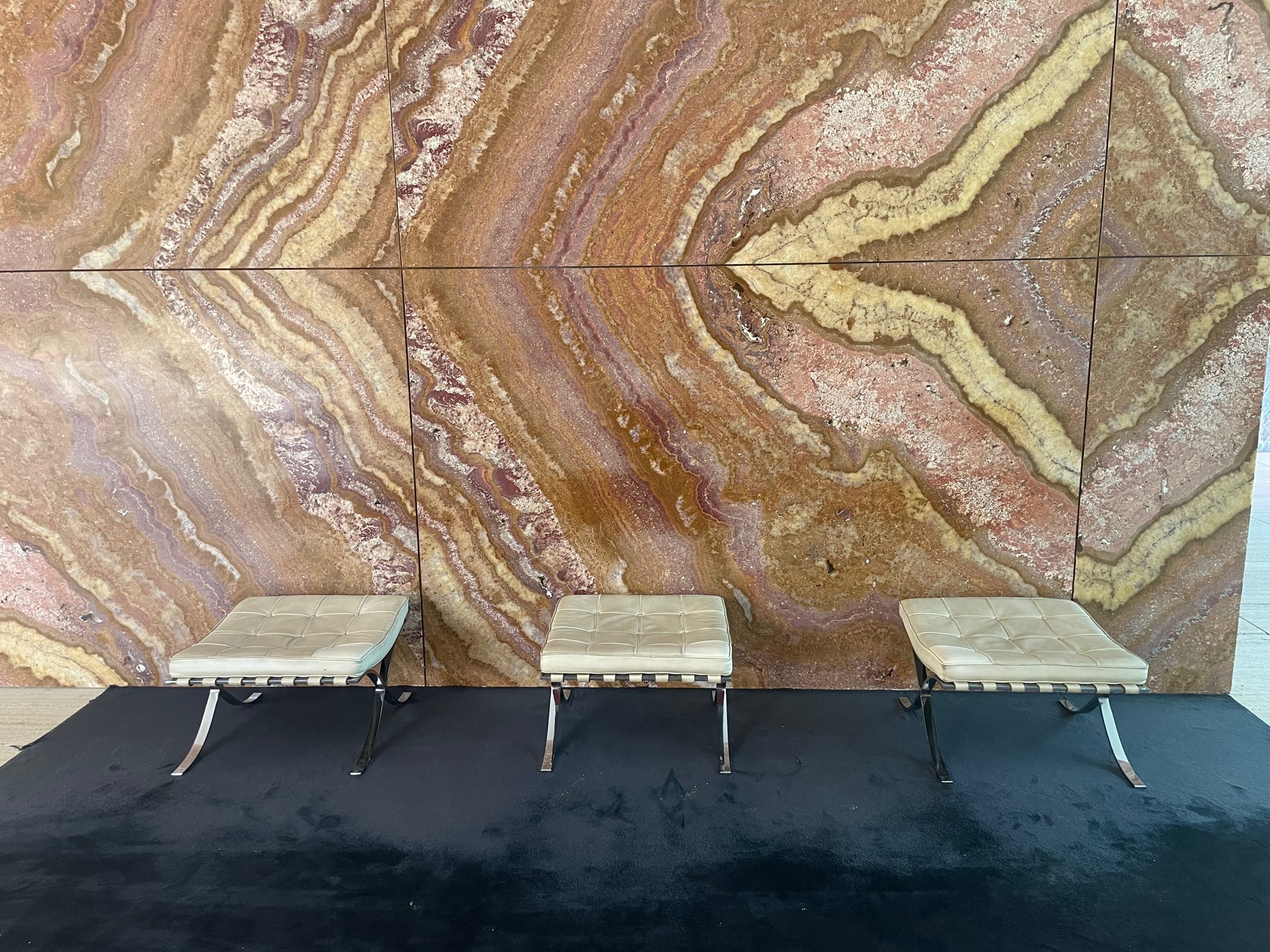
Barcelona Ottoman (showing book-matched onyx wall)

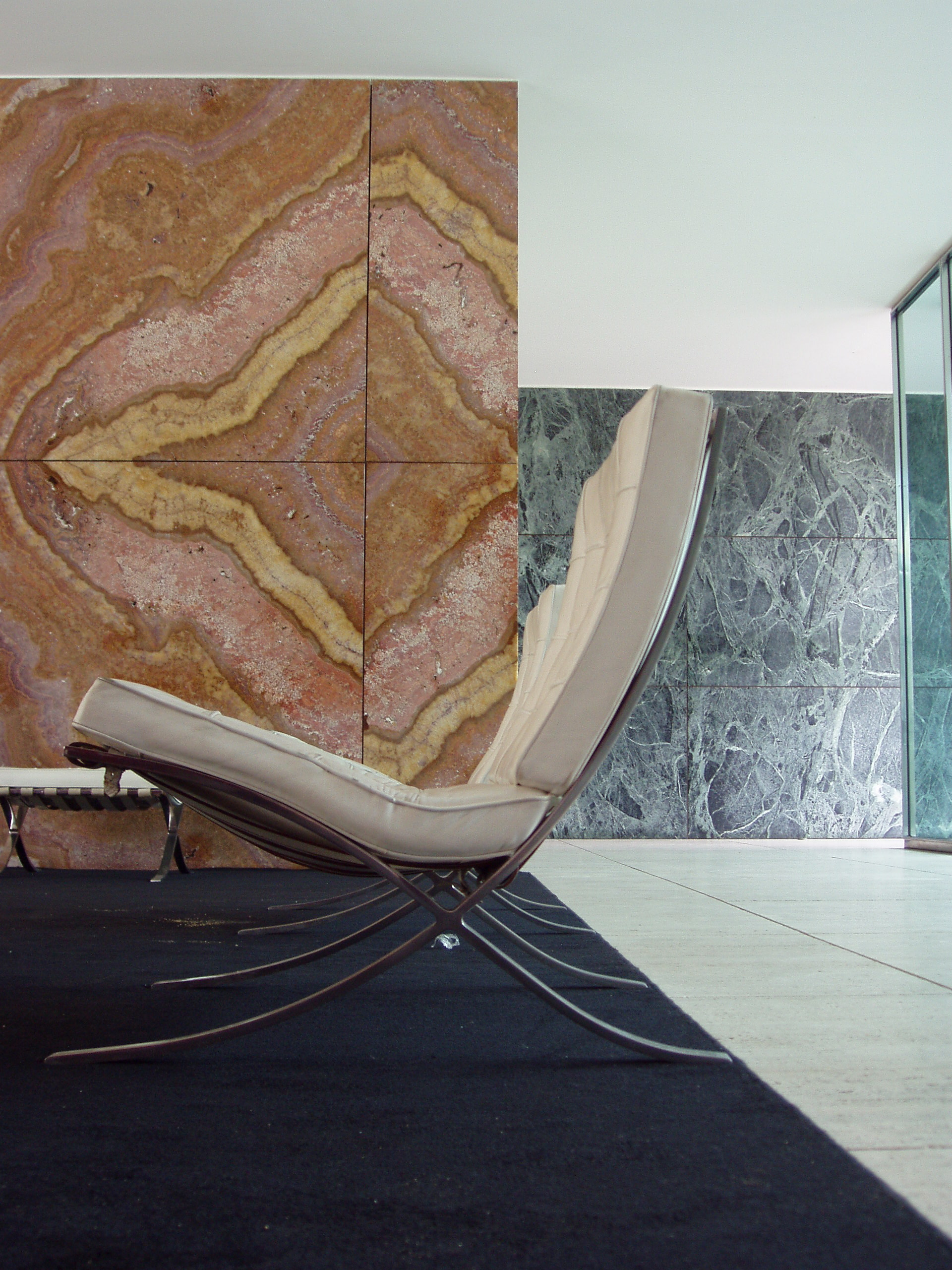
Another view

== See also ==
- Ibero-American Exposition of 1929 – hosted in Seville from 9 May 1929 until 21 June 1930.
