= Bead (woodworking) =

Woodworking decorative treatment

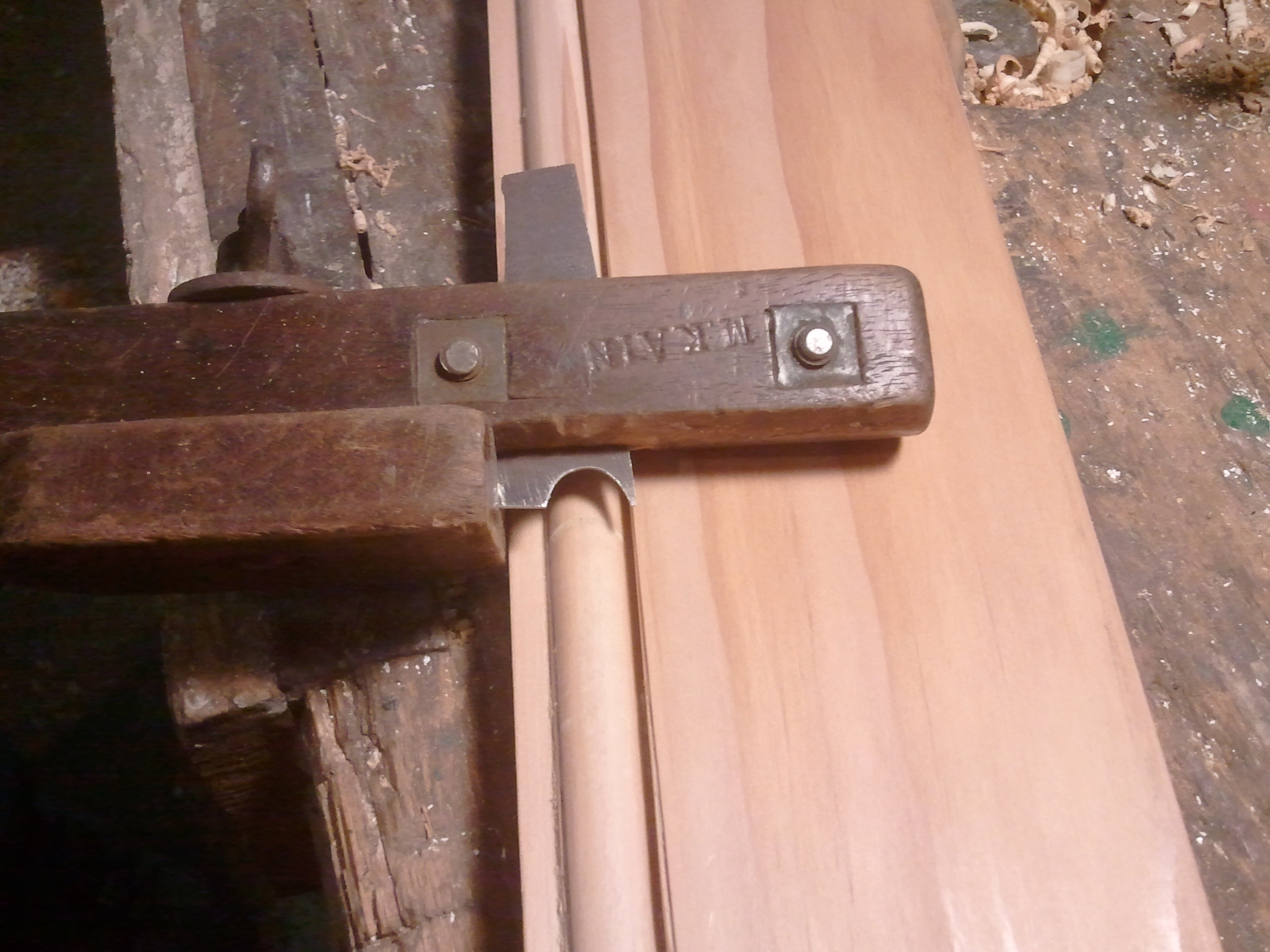
The rounded bead here was made with a scratch stock rather than the more common beading plane or router bit.

A bead is a woodworking decorative treatment applied to various elements of wooden furniture, boxes and other items.

A bead is typically a rounded shape cut into a square edge to soften the edge and provide some protection against splitting. Beads can be simple round shapes, or more complex patterns.

A bead may be created with an electric router, a special moulding handplane or a scratch stock. Beads are usually cut directly into the edge of the item to which the bead is being applied. However, beads applied across the grain are usually cut into a separate piece, which is then fixed in position.

A bead is also an important design element in wood turning, a ring-shaped or convex curve incised into a piece by the use of a chisel or skew.

== Types of beads ==
- Angle bead, a projecting wood moulding at the corner of a plastered wall
- Corner bead is similar, but is usually fully embedded in plaster or drywall, and usually plastic or metal
- Nosing bead, the rounded projection of a stair tread over the riser below
- Parting bead, or parting strip, the feature that separates two sashes in a sash window
