= Burnisher =

Woodworking tool for sharpening a card scraper

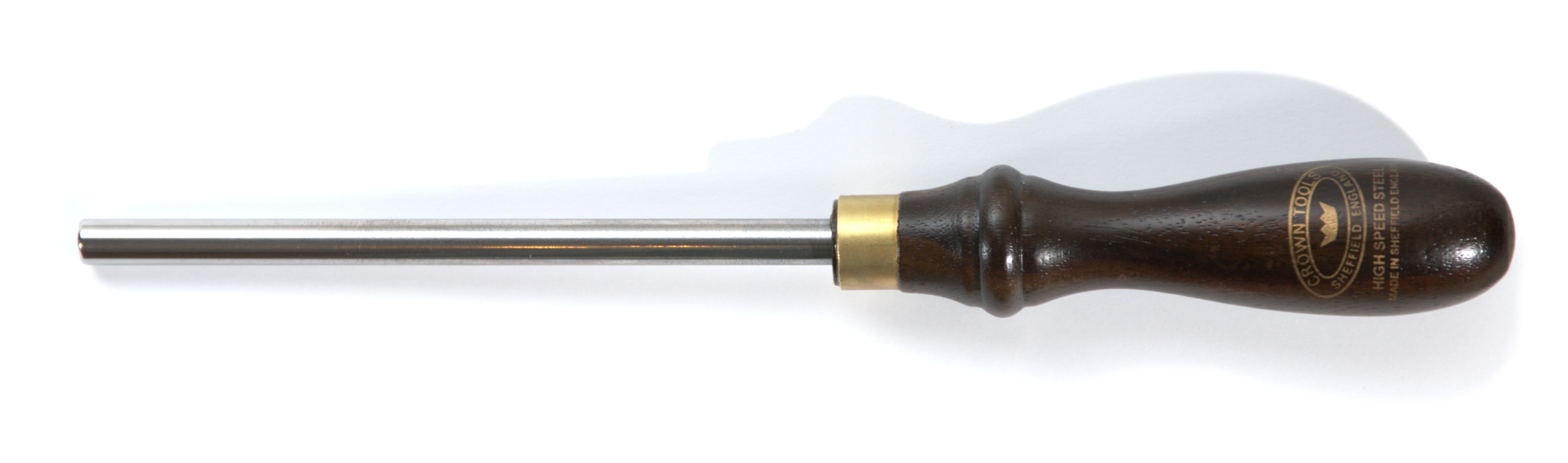
- A burnisher made from high speed steel with a rosewood handle
- Other names: Burnishing rod Ticketer
- Classification: Woodworking hand tool
- Uses: burnishing card scrapers
- Used with: Card scraper, also known as a cabinet scraper

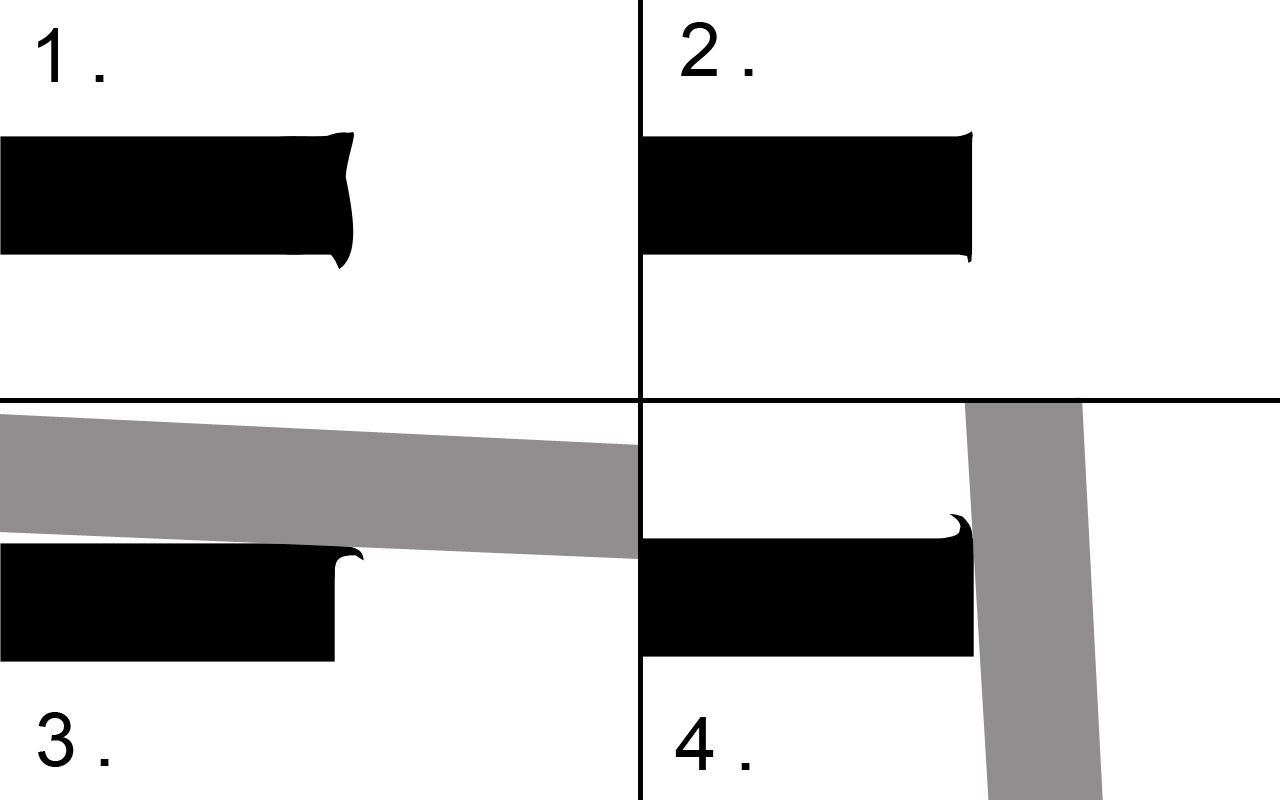
Process of sharpening: 1. Rough edge; 2. Edge squared by filing or grinding; 3. Optional first pass with the burnisher; 4. Rubbing the burnisher at a slight angle against the scraper to turn the burr

A burnisher is a hand tool used in woodworking for creating a burr on a card scraper.

== Description ==
Purpose-manufactured burnishers are polished smooth, typically made from high speed steel (HSS) or cemented carbide, and usually have wooden handles. The shaft profile is usually round, but other profiles include oval and triangular.

Substitutes for shop-bought burnishers are often made with other common workshop items of hardened steels or cemented carbide, such as the back of a gouge, a bevel edged chisel, a nail punch, or an HSS drill bit. Alternatively the woodworker might use a carbide or HSS rod marketed for other uses.

== Limitations ==
To work effectively, a burnisher must be much harder than the scraper. Modern scrapers are typically manufactured from harder steels than in the past, and require burnishing with harder materials, making some traditional makeshift burnishers less effective on modern scrapers.

== Use ==
Once the edges and faces of a card scraper has been filed or ground flat and square, the burnisher is repeatedly rubbed at a slight angle along the scraper's edges, creating a small burr. The specifics of the process can vary significantly between woodworkers. In order for the woodworker to accurately turn the burr on a card scraper, there are burnishers available with angles moulded into the burnisher. As long as the burnisher is used perpendicular to the card scraper, the proper burr angle should be achieved.

== See also ==
- Card scraper
- Burnishing (metal)
