= Multilaminar veneer =

Multilaminar wood veneer uses plantation wood to reproduce decorative effects that are typical of quality wood species (often protected and rare). This aids the preservation of biodiversity and complies with the principles of sustainable forest management.

In this veneering process, large sheets of veneer are produced on a machine similar to a lathe. These are dyed, spread with suitable adhesives, and then compressed and bonded into thick (typically 70 cm) logs, which are then sliced to create the end product. If the sheets are compressed between platens with an undulating surface, the slice will cross several layers to produce a patterned effect. Many different designs can be obtained by varying the platens, the dyes and the stacking order.

Although the product may be considered sustainable, multilaminar veneer does have a relatively high carbon footprint due to the numerous dyeing, laminating, pressing, and slicing operations.
