= Scratch stock =

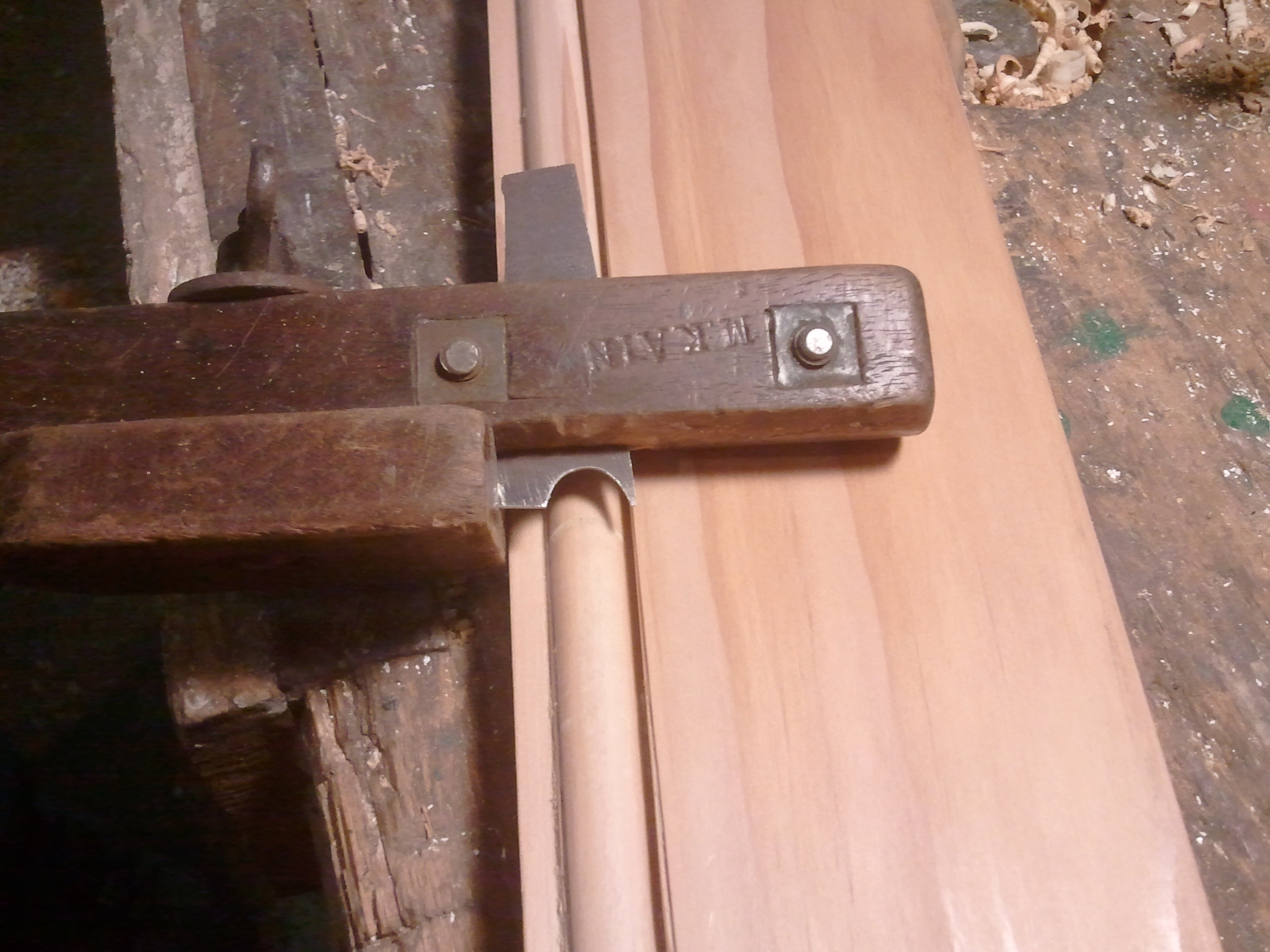
A scratch stock with a 1/4" radius beading cutter, and the resulting bead board

A scratch stock is a woodworking tool used for applying decorative treatments, such as beads to furniture and other wooden items.

Scratch stocks consist of a handle, either wood or metal, with provision to clamp a steel blade into which the profile of the shape to be cut has been filed. Scratch stocks work best in wood which has a dense grain. They work by using a scraping action which gradually cuts away fibers from the wood. The scratch stock is drawn along the wood repeatedly until the desired shape is formed. Scratch stocks may be used to apply edge treatments and may also be used to apply decorative elements to the face of board.
