= Laminated veneer lumber =

Engineered Wood Product used in wood frame construction

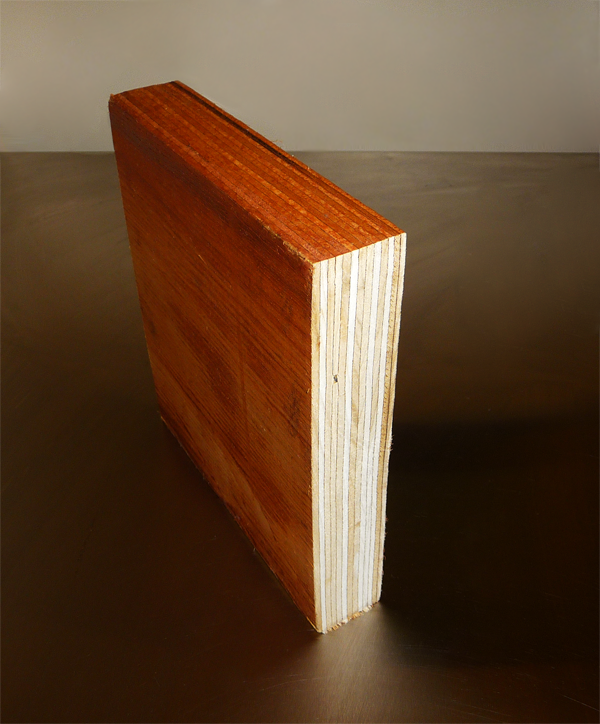
Laminated veneer lumber detail

Laminated veneer lumber (LVL) is an engineered wood product that uses multiple layers of thin wood assembled with adhesives. It is typically used for headers, beams, rimboard, and edge-forming material. LVL offers several advantages over typical milled lumber: Made in a factory under controlled specifications, it is stronger, straighter, and more uniform. Due to its composite nature, it is much less likely than conventional lumber to warp, twist, bow, or shrink. LVL is a type of structural composite lumber, comparable to glued laminated timber (glulam) but with a higher allowable stress. A high-performance, more sustainable alternative to lumber, LVL beams, headers and columns are used in structural applications to carry heavy loads with minimum weight.

== History ==
Structural composite lumber products, including LVL, are a relatively recent innovation. They are the result of new technology and economic pressure to make use of new species and smaller trees that cannot be used to make solid sawn lumber. While plywood became widespread by the early 20th century, the invention of LVL was not until the 1980s after the invention of oriented strand board. The American Wood Council's National Design Specification for Wood Construction is generally updated on a 3- to 5-year cycle. The 1991 release is the first release which mentions LVL. LVL is mentioned as a subcategory of structural glued laminated timber. The first explorations into engineered lumber happened during World War II in the United States. In 1942, an increased demand for wood caused a sudden timber shortage. The war industry utilized a panel material developed by the Homasote Company of Trenton, New Jersey, made of wood pulp and ground newspaper, to be used in place of siding and sheathing for buildings. The invention of laminated veneer lumber as known today can be attributed to Arthur Troutner. While glue laminated wood veneers were in use since the middle of the 19th century on a small scale for furniture and pianos, Troutner was the first to develop a laminated veneer lumber of a scale large enough to be used in construction. In 1971 "Micro=Lam LVL" was introduced. "Micro=Lam LVL" consisted of laminated veneer lumber billets 4 feet (1.2 m) wide, 3 1/2 inches (89 mm) thick, and 80 feet (24 m) long. Troutner proved the structural capabilities of his Micro=Lam product by building a house in Hagerman, Idaho, using beams made of Micro=Lam. Most corporations considered Troutner's invention to be a niche product and it was not until the mid-1980s when logging became an environmental concern and corporations moved toward engineered lumber that LVL became widespread in use.

== Qualities ==
Laminated veneer lumber is similar in appearance to plywood, although in plywood the veneers switch direction while stacking and in LVL the veneers all stack in the same direction. In LVL, the direction of the wood grain is always parallel to the width of the billet. The stacking of these veneers into a complete board, called a billet, creates a single piece of LVL sharing a common direction of wood grain. LVL is typically rated by the manufacturer for elastic modulus and allowable bending stress.

Common elastic moduli are 12, 13 and 14 GPa (1,700,000, 1,900,000 and 2,000,000 psi), and common allowable bending stress values are 19 and 21 MPa (2,800 and 3,000 psi). Although the creation of LVL is often proprietary and thus its make-up is largely dependent on individual manufacturers, in general one cubic meter of North American lumber is composed of 97.54% wood, 2.41% of phenol formaldehyde resin, 0.02% of phenol-resorcinol-formaldehyde resin, and 0.03% fillers.

== Manufacturing ==
LVL is commonly manufactured in North America by companies that also manufacture I-joists. LVL is manufactured to sizes compatible with the depth of I-joist framing members for use as beams and headers. Additionally, some manufacturers further cut LVL into sizes for use as chord-members on I-joists. In 2012, North American LVL manufacturers produced more than 1.2 million cubic metres (43.4 million cubic feet) of LVL in 18 different facilities, and in 2013 the production increased by more than 14%. It is not coincidental that LVL mills are often co-located with I-joist manufacturing facilities as many builders use a combination of I-joists and LVL in floor and roof assemblies.

== Use ==
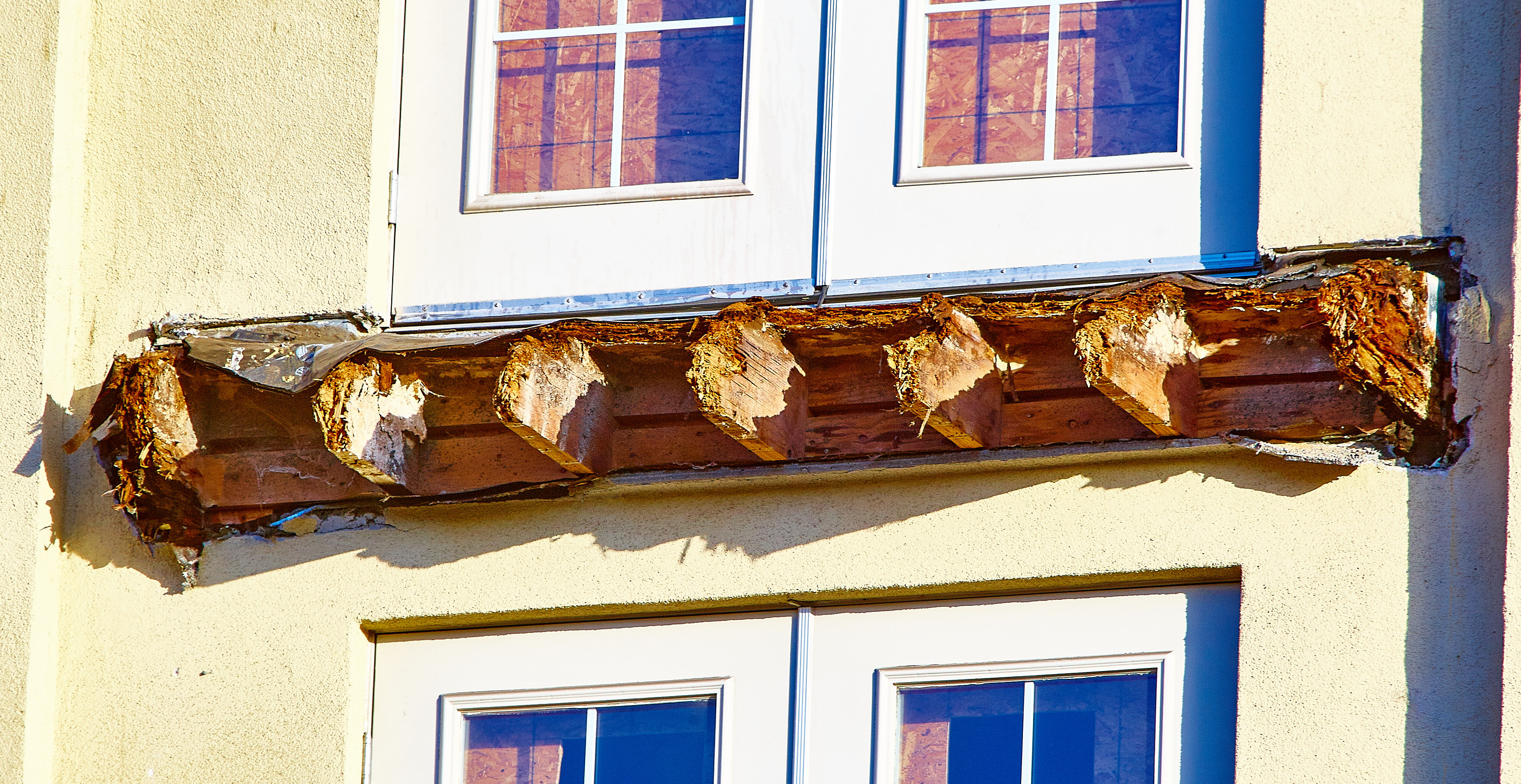
Rotten LVL joists from the Berkeley balcony collapse

Because it is specifically sized to be compatible with I-joist floor framing, residential builders and building designers like the combination of I-joist and LVL floor and roof assemblies. LVL is considered to be a highly reliable building material that provides many of the same attributes associated with large sized timbers. LVL can also be used in combination with gluelam as an outer gluelam tension lam to increase the strength of the gluelam beam. However, due to the fact that the assembly adhesives limit the penetration of chemicals typically used to treat outdoor-rated lumber, LVL may not be suitable for outdoor load-bearing use — rotten LVL joists were blamed for the Berkeley balcony collapse which killed 7 people. The breakdown of LVL end uses in North America is 33% new single family residential construction, 25% residential renovations and upkeep, 8% new non-residential construction and 34% manufacturing furniture and other products.

== Structural composite lumber ==
LVL belongs to the category of engineered wood called structural composite lumber. Other members of this category are parallel strand lumber (PSL) and laminated strand lumber (LSL). All members of this category are strong and predictable, and are thus interchangeable for some applications. PSL is made from veneers that are cut up into long strands and oriented parallel to its length before being compressed into its final shape. LSL is also made from strands rather than veneer, although the strands are shorter and aligned with less precision than PSL and is created as billets that are like a thick version of oriented strand board. Billets of PSL and LVL are very similar although their sizes are different. Billets of PSL can be as large as 12 inches (300 mm) wide and 60 feet (18 m) long while LVL can range up to 4 feet (1.2 m) wide and 80 feet (24 m) long.

== See also ==
- Cross-laminated timber
- Homasote
- Papercrete
- Parallel strand lumber
