= Crosswall construction =

Building technique

Crosswall construction is a building technique that uses prefabricated concrete modules with load-bearing walls that act to communicate the entire weight of the building to its foundation.

== See also ==
- Curtain wall (architecture)
