= Glued laminated timber =

Building material

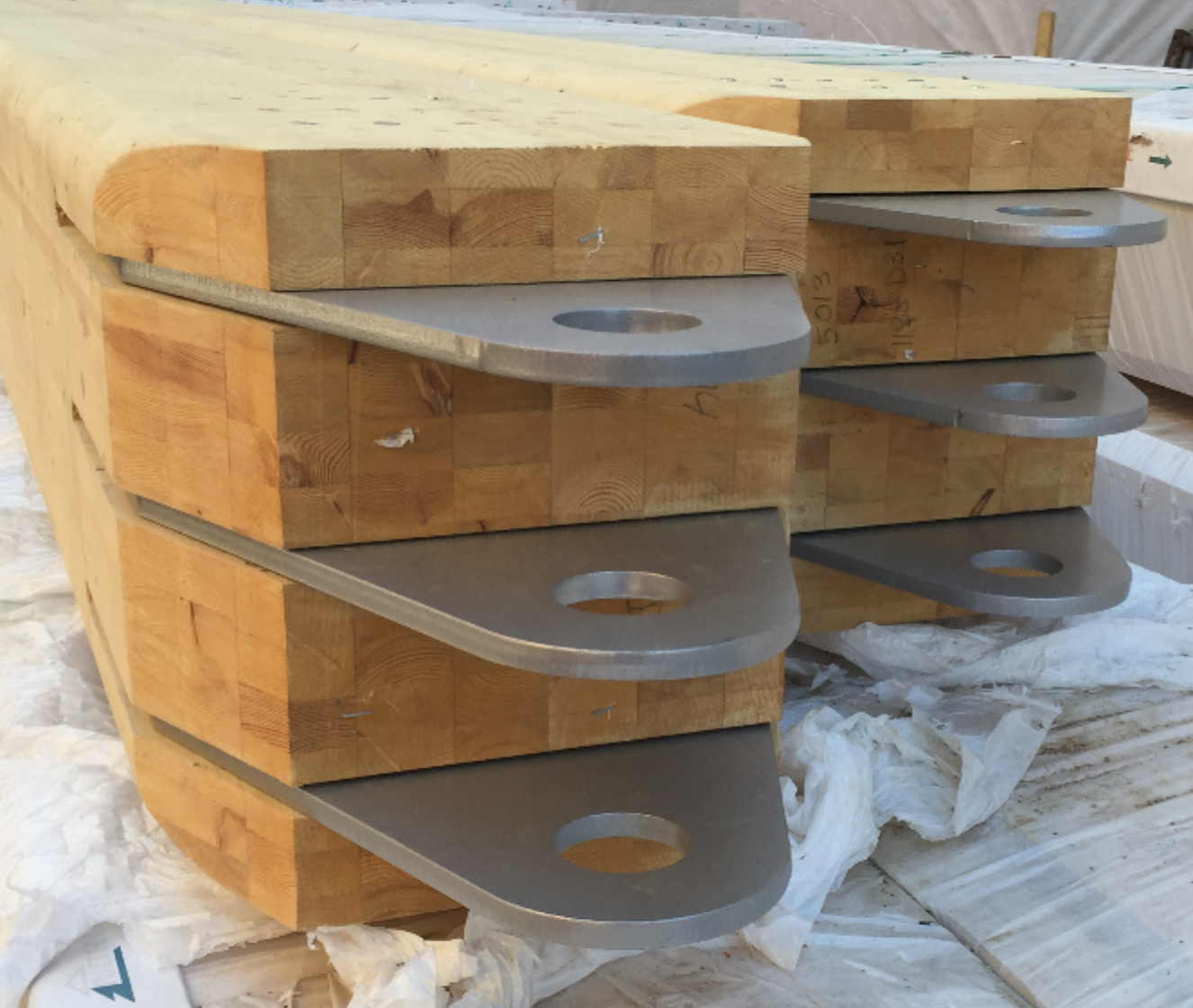
Glulam brace with plates used for connections

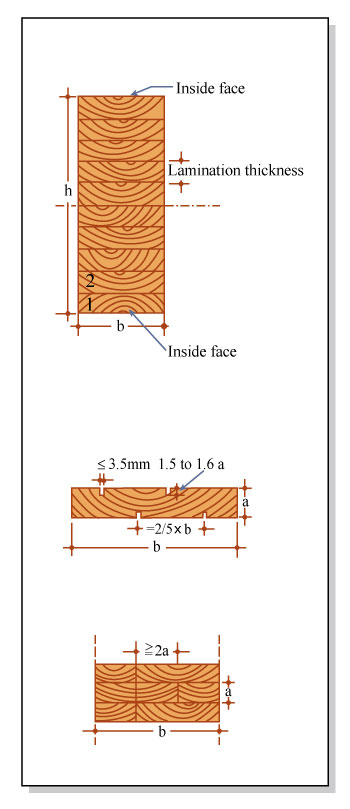
Diagram of glued laminated timber (glulam).

Glued laminated timber (often shortened to glulam) is a structural engineered wood product made by bonding layers of dimensional lumber with moisture-resistant structural adhesives so the wood grain in each layer runs parallel to the member’s length. The resulting elements can be manufactured in a range of sizes and shapes, including straight members and curved components such as arches and frames used in building structures.

In North America, the lumber used for the laminations is commonly called laminating stock (or lamstock). Glulam is produced by preparing and grading lumber, joining boards to create longer laminations, applying adhesive and pressing the layers under controlled conditions, and then finishing the cured members to meet structural and appearance specifications.

Glulam is used in applications that benefit from long spans and prefabricated structural members, including roof systems, public buildings, and bridges, and is manufactured to meet established building and product standards.

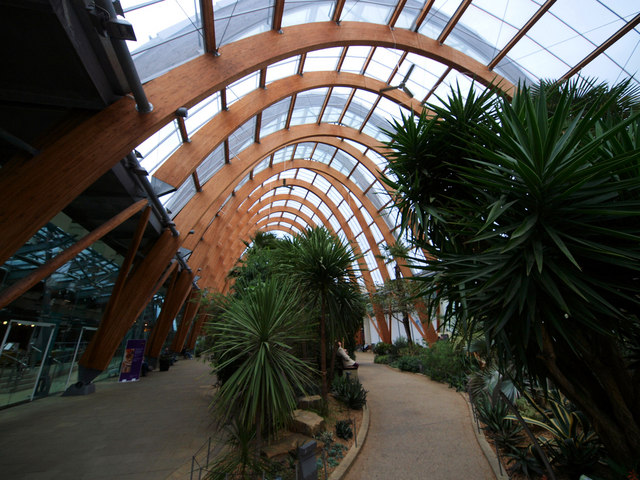
Glulam arches of the Sheffield Winter Garden

== History ==
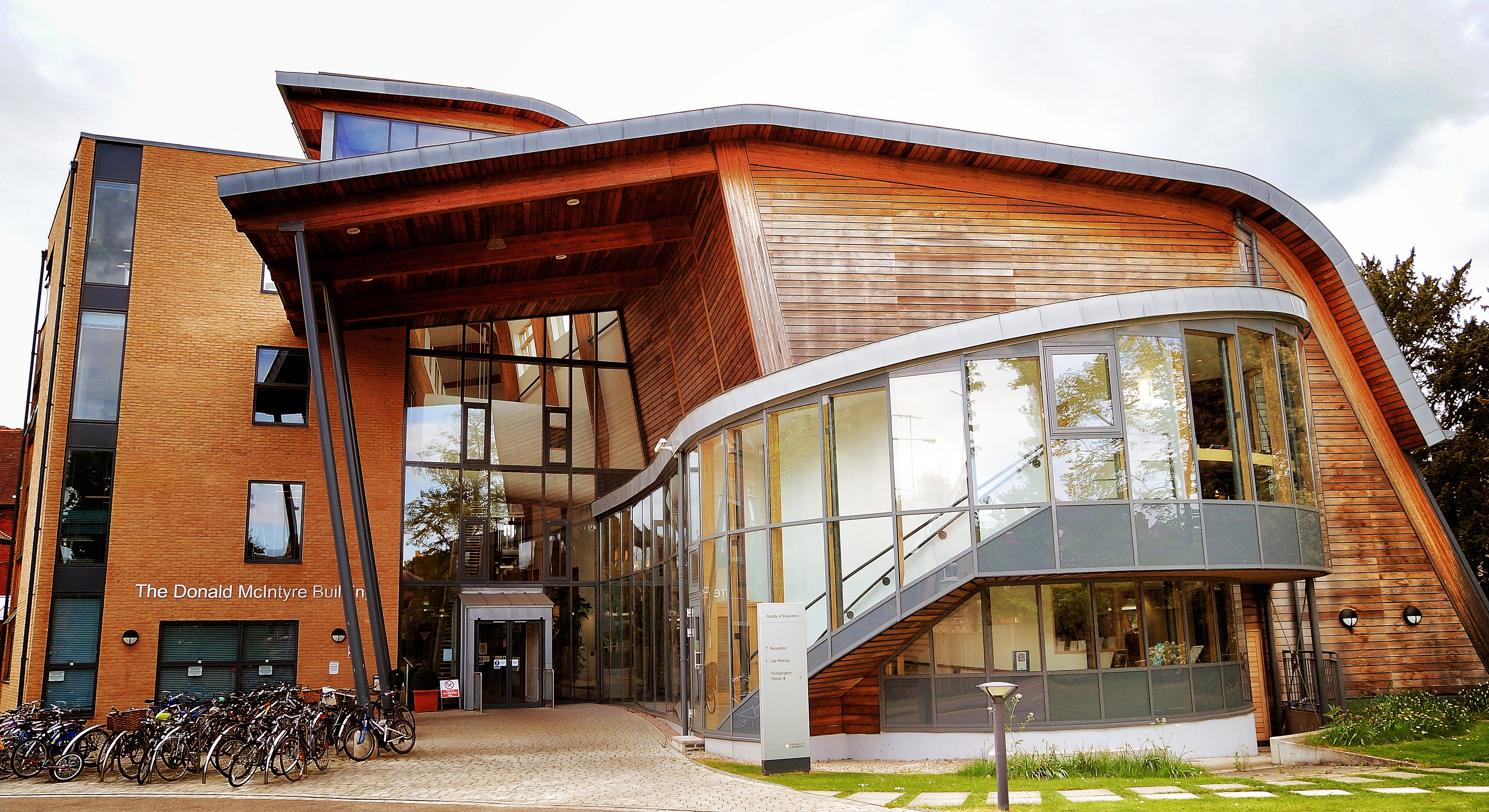
Curved glulam-framed building at the Faculty of Education, University of Cambridge.

The principles of glulam construction are believed to date back to the 1860s, in the assembly room of King Edward VI College, a school in Southampton, England. The first patent emerged in 1901 when Otto Karl Freidrich Hetzer, a carpenter from Weimar, Germany, patented this method of construction. Approved in Switzerland, Hetzer's patent explored creating a straight beam out of several laminations glued together. In 1906 he received a patent in Germany for curved sections of glulam. Other countries in Europe soon began approving patents and by 1922, glulam had been used in 14 countries.

The technology was first brought to the United States by Max Hanisch Sr., who had been associated with the Hetzer firm in 1906 before emigrating to the United States in 1923. With no financial backing, it was not until 1934 that Hanisch was able to first use glulam in the United States. The project, a school and community gym in Peshtigo, Wisconsin, took time to get started, as manufacturers were hard to find, but eventually the Thompson Brothers Boat Manufacturing Company took on the project. The Wisconsin Industrial Commission, however, rejected the arches as they had no previous experience working with glulam. A compromise was reached in which the arches could be used if they were used in conjunction with bolts, lags, metal strapping, and angles to reinforce the structure. Though the reinforcements were unnecessary, ground finally broke in late 1934 featuring four spans of three-hinged arches with clear spans of 20 metres (64 ft). The partnership for this project led to the creation of Unit Structures Inc., a construction firm for glulam owned by both the Hanisch and Thompson families.

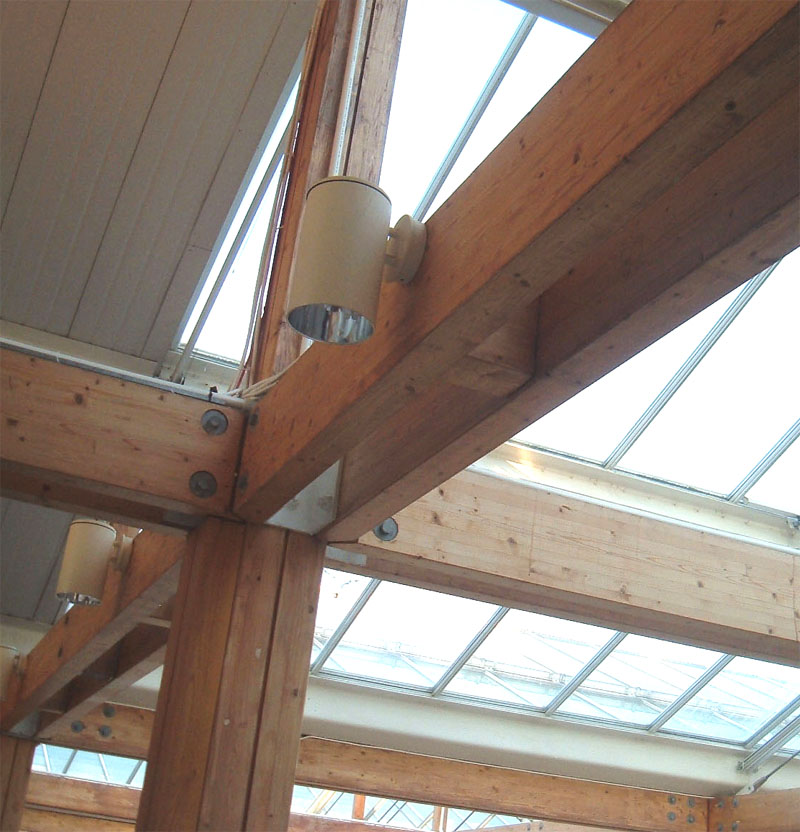
Glulam frame of a roof structure

In 1936, Unit Structures patented both the forming equipment used to produce glulam arches and the glulam arches themselves. A second project, this time for the Forest Products Laboratory (FPL), gave Unit Structures the opportunity to prove the strength and stiffness of glulam members to architects and engineers. Full-scale load tests conducted by placing 14.3 tonnes (31,500 lb) of sandbags on the roof exceeded the design specs by 50%. The noted deflections were also in favor of the system. While the results took some time to get published, the test enabled Unit Structures to continue building with glulam. At this time, I-sections featuring plywood webs and glulam flanges became popular in Europe while rectangular sections became the norm in America. The I-sections saved on lumber, which was beneficial to Europeans as they had high lumber costs but were more labor intensive, which was expensive in the States. The glulam system piqued the interest of those on the west coast and many firms began to engage with it.

In 1942, the introduction of a fully water-resistant phenol-resorcinol adhesive enabled glulam to be used in exposed exterior environments without concern of glue line degradation, expanding its applicable market. During the midst of World War II, glulam construction became more widespread as steel was needed for the war effort. In 1952, leading fabricators of engineered and solid wood joined forces to create the American Institute of Timber Construction (AITC) to help standardize the industry and promote its use. The first U.S. manufacturing standard for glulam was published by the Department of Commerce in 1963. Since then, glulam manufacturing has spread within the United States and into Canada and has been used for other structures, such as bridges, as well. Glulam is standardized under ANSI Standard A190.1.

== Manufacturing ==
=== Drying and grading the lumber ===
The lumber used to produce glulam may come to the manufacturers pre-dried. A hand-held or on-the-line moisture meter is used to check the moisture level. Each piece of lumber going into the manufacturing process should have a moisture content between 8% and 14% in accordance with the adhesive used. Lumber above this threshold is redried. Knots on the ends of the dried lumber are trimmed. Lumber is then grouped based on the grade.

=== Joining the lumber to form longer laminations ===
To create lengths of glulam longer than those typically available for sawn lumber, the lumber must be end-jointed. The most common joint for this is a finger joint, 1.1 inches (28 mm) in length, that is cut on either end with special cutter heads. A structural resin, typically RF curing melamine formaldehyde (MF) or PF resin, is applied to the joint between successive boards and cured under end pressure using a continuous RF curing system. After the resins have cured, the lumber is cut to length and planed on each side to ensure smooth surfaces for gluing.

=== Gluing the layers ===
Once planed, a glue extruder spreads the resin onto the lumber. This resin is most often phenol-resorcinol-formaldehyde, but PF resin or melamine-urea-formaldehyde (MUF) resin can also be used. For straight beams, the resinated lumber is stacked in a specific lay-up pattern in a clamping bed where a mechanical or hydraulic system presses the layers together. For curved beams, the lumber is instead stacked in a curved form. These beams are cured at room temperature for 5 to 16 hours before the pressure is released. Combining pressure with RF curing can reduce the time needed for curing.

=== Finishing and fabrication ===
The wide-side faces of the beams are sanded or planed to remove resin that was squeezed out between the boards. The narrow top and bottom faces may also be sanded if necessary to achieve the desired appearance. Corners are often rounded as well. Specifications for appearance may require additional finishing such as filling knot holes with putty, finer sanding, and applying sealers, finishes, or primers.

== Technological developments ==
=== Resin glues ===
When glued laminated timber was introduced as a building material in the early twentieth century, casein glues (which are waterproof but have lower shear strength) were widely used. Joints with casein glues had detachment failures due to inherent stresses in the wood. Cold-curing synthetic resin glues were invented in 1928. "Kaurit" and other urea-formaldehyde resin glues are inexpensive, easy to use, waterproof and enable high adhesive strength. The development of resin glues contributed to the wide use of glued laminated timber construction. Also, there is today another technique for gluing green wood (of high moisture content) to fabricate such laminated products.

=== Finger joints ===
The use of finger joints with glulam allowed for production of glulam beams and columns on large scale. Glulam finger joints provide a large surface area for gluing. Automatic finger-jointing machines cut the pointed joints, connect and glue them together under pressure, allowing for a strong, durable joint, capable of carrying high loads comparable to natural wood with the same cross-section.

=== Computer numerical control ===
Computer numerical control (CNC) allows to cut glued laminated timber into unusual shapes with a high degree of precision. CNC machine tools can utilize up to five axes, which enables undercutting and hollowing-out processes. The cost-effective CNC machines carve the material using mechanical tools, like a router.

== Advantages ==
Advantages to using glulam in construction:

- Size and shape - By laminating a number of smaller pieces of lumber into a single large structural member, the dimensions of glulam members are only limited by transport and handling rather than the size of a tree like sawn lumber. This also enables the use of smaller trees harvested from second-growth forests and plantations rather than relying on old-growth forests. Glulam can also be manufactured in a variety of shapes, so it offers architects artistic freedom without sacrificing structural requirements.
- Versatility - Because the size and shape of glulam members can be so variable, they are able to be used as both beams and columns.
- Strength and stiffness - Glulam has a higher strength to weight ratio compared to both concrete and steel. Glulam also reduces the impact defects in the wood have on the strength of the member making it stronger than sawn lumber as well. Glulam has also been proven to have a higher resistance to lateral-torsional buckling than steel.
- Environmentally friendly - Glulam has much lower embodied energy than reinforced concrete and steel because the laminating process allows the timber to be used for much longer spans, heavier loads, and more complex shapes than reinforced concrete or steel. The embodied energy to produce it is one sixth of that of a comparable strength of steel. Also, as glulam is a wood product, it naturally sequesters carbon, keeping it from being released into the atmosphere. As long as the wood used to manufacture the glulam members comes from a sustainably managed forest, glulam is a renewable resource.
- Fire safety - While glulam is inherently flammable because it is made of wood, if it catches on fire a char layer forms that protects the interior of the member and thus maintains the strength of the member for some time.

== Disadvantages ==
- Material cost - Glulam may be more costly than concrete at high axial loads, though this depends on location and availability/ abundance of either material. While glulam beams may be cheaper than HEA steel beams in some cases, it is not a significant difference.
- Moisture - Glulam, especially when used for bridge projects, is susceptible to changes in moisture which can impact its strength. The bending strength of glulam exposed to a number of wet/dry cycles can decrease dramatically (by 43.5% in one study).
- Dimensions - Compared to steel, glulam generally requires larger members to support the same load, although glulam member sizes may be similar to reinforced concrete. The cross-sectional area and height of glulam members are significantly greater than those of steel to perform the same function. Compared to reinforced concrete, the relative size of glulam members depends on the loading applied.
- Biodegradation - As a wood product, glulam is subject to concern regarding biodegradation. In regions with higher risk, measures to protect the glulam need to be taken.

== Applications ==
=== Sport structures ===
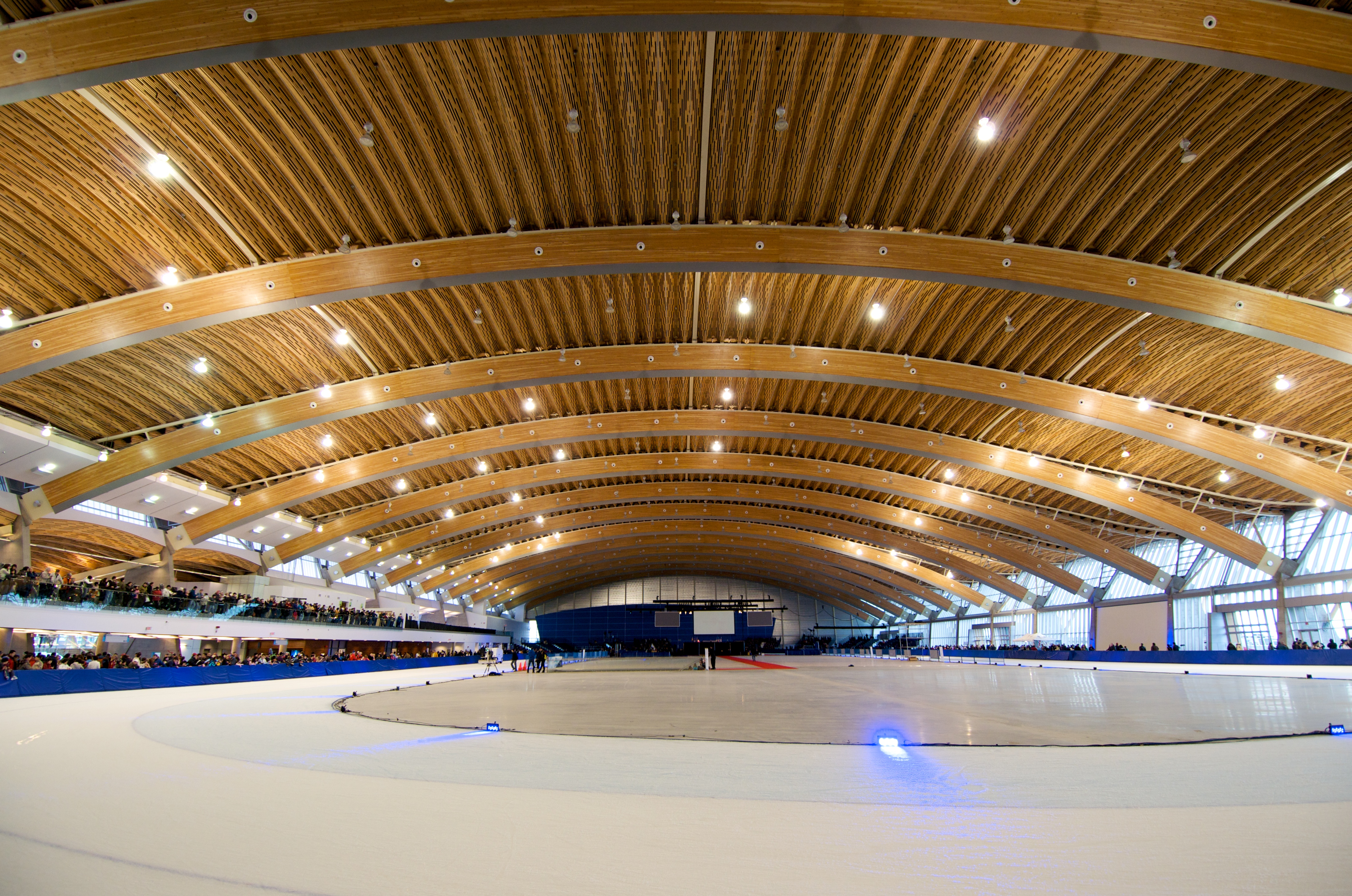
Richmond Olympic Oval

Large stadium roofs are a common application for wide-span glulam beams. Advantages are the light weight of the material and the ability to furnish long lengths and large cross-sections. Prefabrication is invariably employed and the structural engineer needs to specify methods for delivery and erection of the large members at an early stage in the design.

The PostFinance Arena is an example of a wide-span sports stadium roof using glulam arches reaching up to 85 metres. The structure was built in Bern, Switzerland, in 1967, and has subsequently been refurbished and extended. Eastern Kentucky University's Alumni Coliseum in the United States was built in 1963 with the world's largest glued laminated arches, which span 93.967 metres (308 ft 3 1/2 in).

The roof of the Richmond Olympic Oval, built for speed skating events at the 2010 Winter Olympic Games in Vancouver, British Columbia, Canada, features one of the world's largest clearspan wooden structures. The roof includes 2,400 cubic metres of Douglas fir lamstock lumber in glulam beams. A total of 34 yellow cedar glulam posts support the overhangs where the roof extends beyond the walls.

Anaheim Ice, a rink in California, United States, was built in 1995 by Disney Development Company and architect Frank Gehry using large double-curved yellow pine glulam beams.

=== Bridges ===
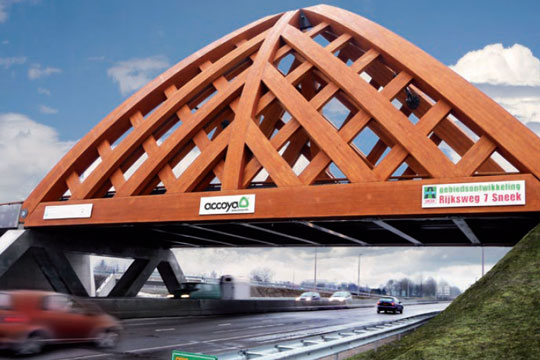
Heavy-traffic Accoya Glulam Bridge at Sneek, the Netherlands

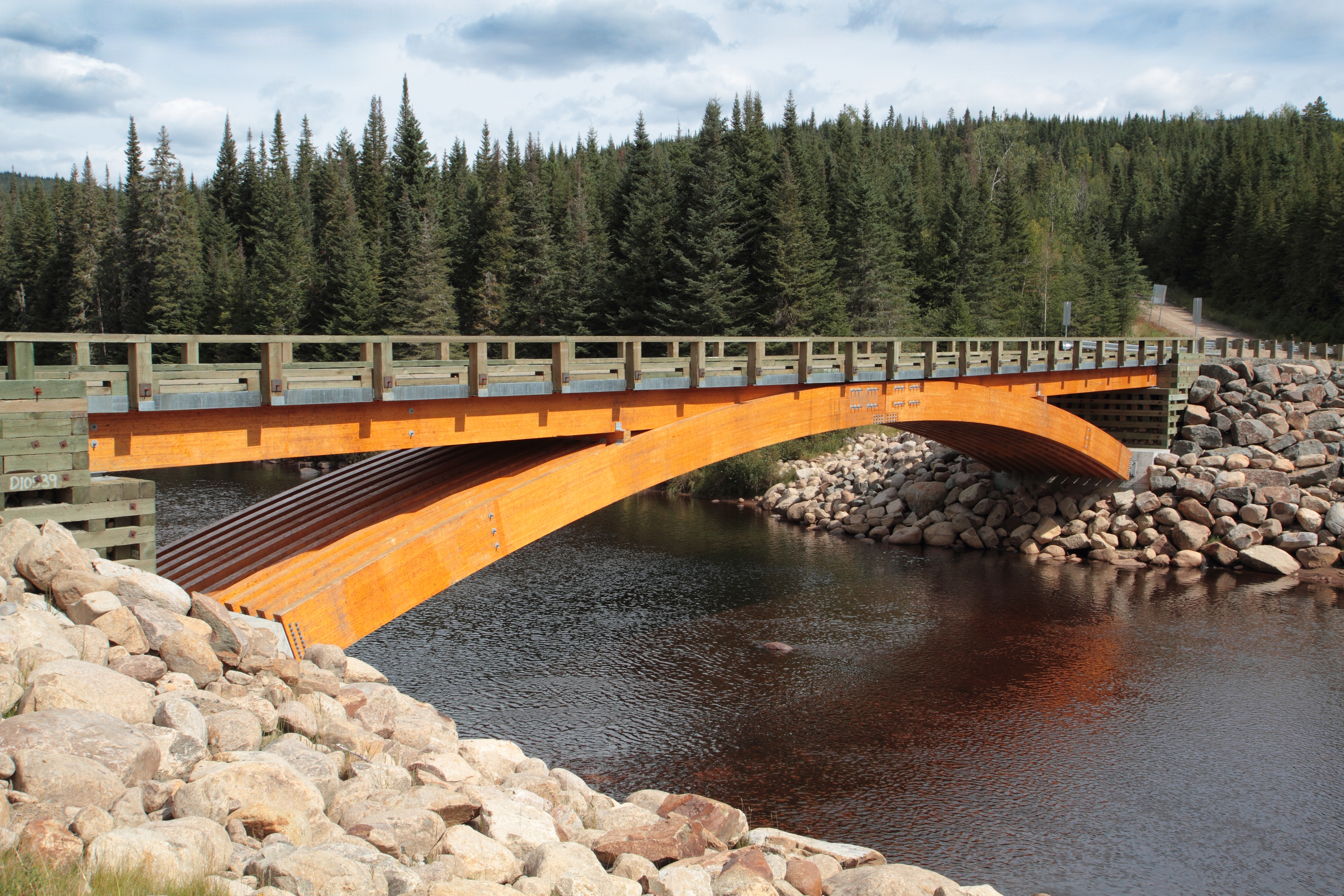
Glulam bridge crossing Montmorency River, Quebec

Glulam has been used for pedestrian, forest, highway, and railway bridges. Pressure-treated glulam timbers or timbers manufactured from naturally durable wood species are well suited for creating bridges and waterfront structures. Wood is naturally resistant to corrosion by salt used for de-icing roadways.

One North American glulam bridge is Keystone Wye in the Black Hills of South Dakota, constructed in 1967. The da Vinci Bridge in Norway, completed in 2001, is almost completely constructed with glulam. The Kingsway Pedestrian Bridge in Burnaby, British Columbia, Canada, is constructed of cast-in-place concrete for the support piers, structural steel and glulam for the arch, a post tensioned precast concrete walking deck, and stainless steel support rods connecting the arch to the walking deck.

=== Religious buildings ===
The interior of the Cathedral of Christ the Light formed with glued laminated timber

Glulam is used for the construction of multi-use facilities such as churches, school buildings, and libraries. The Cathedral of Christ the Light in Oakland, California, is one such example and uses glulam to enhance the ecological and aesthetic effect. It was built as the replacement of the Cathedral of Saint Francis de Sales, which became unusable after the Loma Prieta earthquake in 1989. The 2,010-square-metre (21,600 ft^{2}), 34-metre-high (110 ft) vesica piscis-shaped building formed the frame with a glued-laminated timber beam and steel-rod skeleton covered with a glass skin. Considering the conventional mode of construction with steel or reinforced concrete moment-frame, this glulam-and-steel combination case is regarded as an advanced way to realize the economy and aesthetic in the construction.

As an alternative to new-felled oak trees, glued laminated timber was proposed as the structural material in the replacement spire of Notre-Dame de Paris, destroyed by fire in 2019.

=== Other ===
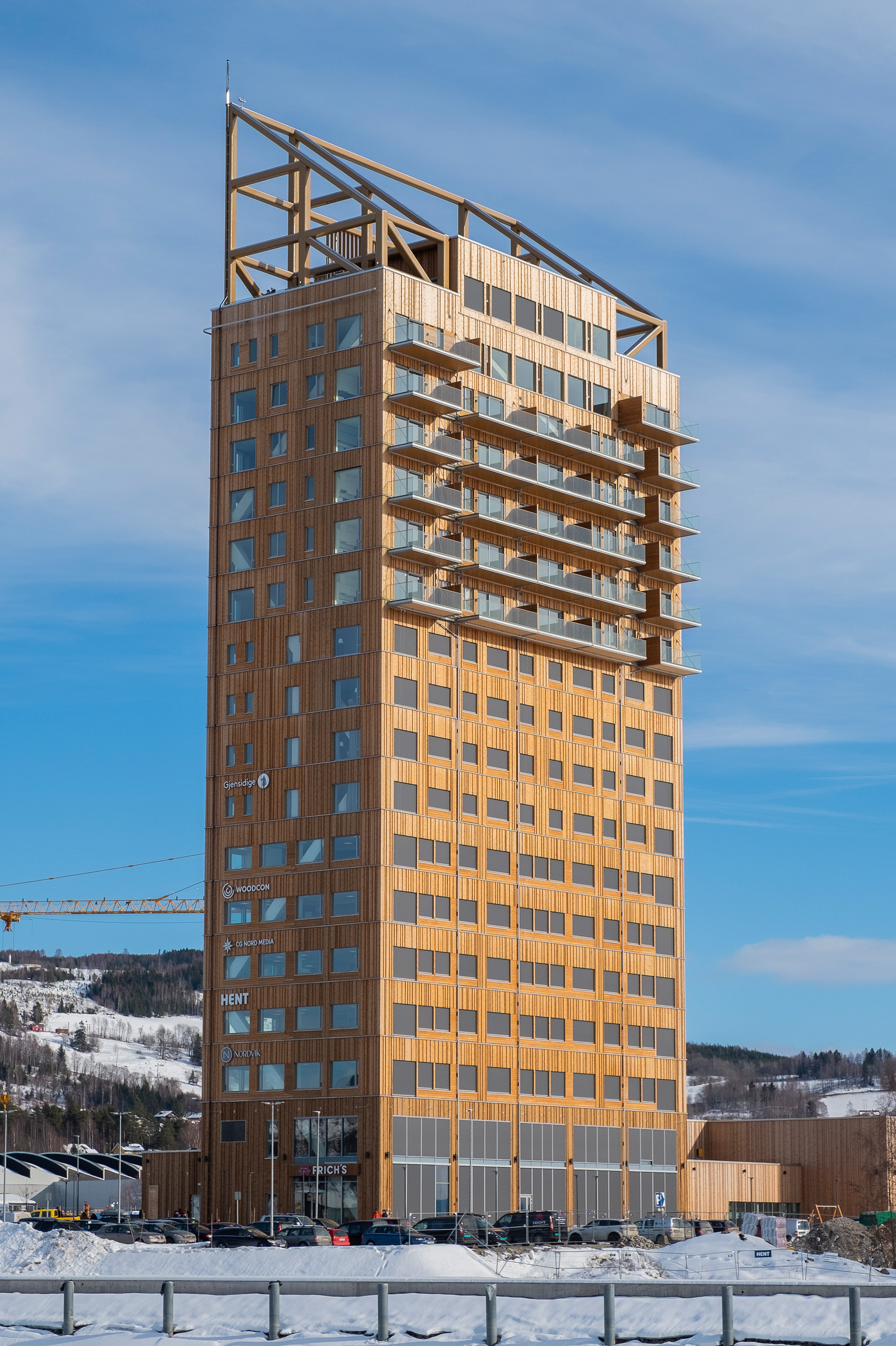
Mjøstårnet, on the shore of Lake Mjøsa.

In 2019, the world's tallest structure employing glulam was Mjøstårnet, an 18-story mixed-use building in Brumunddal, Norway. In 2022, the Ascent MKE building in Milwaukee, Wisconsin, surpassed it with 26 stories, measuring over 86 meters tall.

The roof of the Centre Pompidou-Metz museum in France is composed of sixteen kilometers of glued laminated timber intersecting to form hexagonal units. With a surface area of 8,000 m^{2}, the irregular geometry of the roof, featuring various curves and counter-curves, resembles a Chinese hat.

== Failures ==
In 2005, researchers at Lund University, Sweden, found a number of failures of glulam structures in Scandinavian countries. They concluded that construction faults or design errors were responsible. In January 2002 the roof of the Siemens velodrome arena in Copenhagen collapsed when a joint between glulam trusses failed at the point of its dowel fastenings.In February 2003 the roof of a newly built exhibition hall in Jyväskylä, Finland, collapsed. It was found that during construction the specified number of dowels at joints between glulam timbers were missing or had been wrongly placed.

The collapse of the Perkolo bridge in Sjoa, Norway, in 2016 was caused by a design miscalculation of stresses at joints. Following this incident, thirteen road bridges of glulam construction were checked, with only minor faults found.

On 15 August 2022, Tretten Bridge in Gudbrandsdalen, Norway, collapsed as two vehicles were crossing. It was made with glulam and steel construction and had been erected in 2012, with a design life of "at least 100 years". The cause of the failure was not immediately apparent, although during the 2016 inspection, one joint was found to have dowels that were too short.

== See also ==
- Fiberboard
- I joist
- Masonite
- Oriented strand board
- Parallam
- Particle board
