= American Wood Council =

North American trade association

- Established: 2010
- Headquarters: Leesburg, Virginia
- CEO: Robert Glowinski
- Website: awc.org

The American Wood Council (AWC) is a trade association that represents North American wood products manufacturers.

North American membership includes companies and industry associations; among them, Boise Cascade LLC, Canfor USA/New South, Georgia-Pacific LLC, Interfor Corporation, Kapstone, Louisiana Pacific, Masonite, Norbord Inc., Plum Creek Timber, Potlatch Corp., Sierra Pacific Industries, West Fraser, West Rock Company, Weyerhaeuser Company, and the Canadian Wood Council.

== History ==
AWC was re-chartered in June 2010, with a broader mandate than a former predecessor namesake. Up until 2010, the wood products industry was represented by the American Forest & Paper Association (AF&PA), which now represents pulp and paper manufacturers.
