= Tretten Bridge =

Norway road bridge that collapsed in 2022

Tretten Bridge Tretten bru
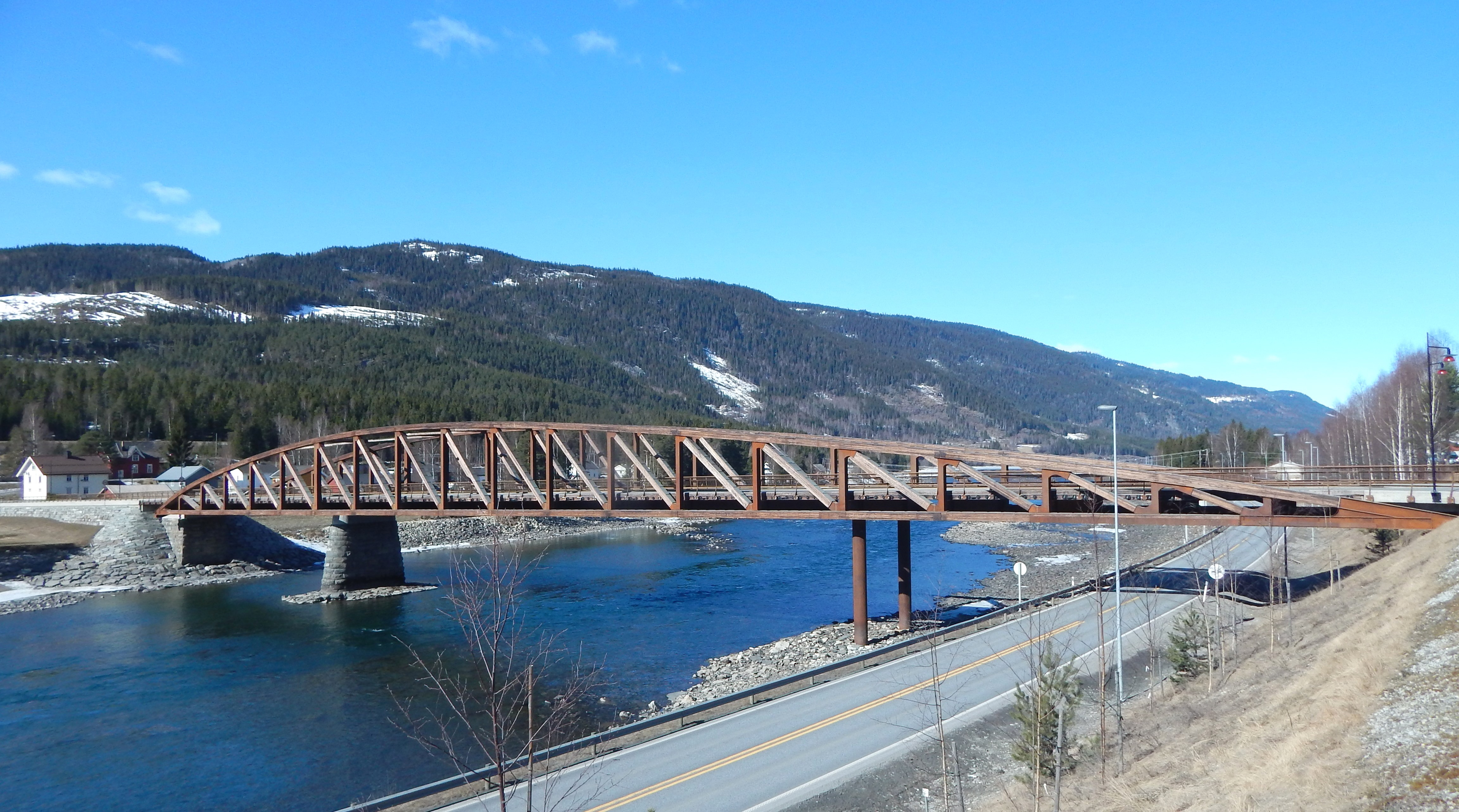
- Tretten Bridge in 2015
- Coordinates: 61°18′44″N 10°18′01″E
- Carried: cars and trucks
- Crossed: Gudbrandsdalen and E6 road

Characteristics
- Material: Glulam and steel
- Total length: 148 metres (486 ft)
- Width: 10 metres (33 ft)
- Longest span: 70 metres (230 ft)
- Piers in water: 3
- No. of lanes: 2

History
- Architect: Plan Arkitekter
- Designer: Norconsult
- Constructed by: Moelven
- Opened: 15 June 2012; 14 years ago
- Collapsed: 15 August 2022; 4 years ago
- Replaced: 1895 steel truss bridge at same location

Statistics
- Daily traffic: 1,600 (2021)

Location
- Interactive map of Tretten Bridge

Tretten Bridge was a road bridge in Tretten, Øyer, Norway, that carried county road 254 over Gudbrandsdalen and the E6 road. The bridge was a truss bridge in glulam and steel and was opened on 15 June 2012. It collapsed on the morning of 15 August 2022, after only ten years and two months in operation.

Permission was given for a temporary replacement bridge in October 2022, on the condition that work above the waterline is finished before the spring flood in April 2023.

== Construction ==
There were two types of beams used for the trusses on the bridge: glued laminated timber beams were slanted, while the steel beams were vertical; weathering steel was used.

The bridge replaced a steel truss bridge built in 1895 at the same location. The pier on the west side from the original bridge was in good condition and was used again after reinforcement. The new bridge was a truss bridge with two lanes and asphalt pavement. The upper and lower girders, and angle and cross braces, were made of glulam, while the vertical rods were made of steel. The bridge was 148 metres (486 ft) long with a main span of 70 metres (230 ft) and a width of 10 metres (33 ft). The project was carried out by Norconsult in collaboration with Plan Arkitekter.[6]

While the bridge was being constructed in 2012, a temporary crossing was made using 45,000 cubic metres (1,600,000 cu ft) of stone filling in the river. The existing stone pillars were reinforced with concrete and two steel core piles were driven 40 metres (130 ft) into the river bottom. The glulam beams were produced by Moelven, who trial-assembled the bridge before transport to the site. The total cost was NOK 65 million.

== Collapse ==
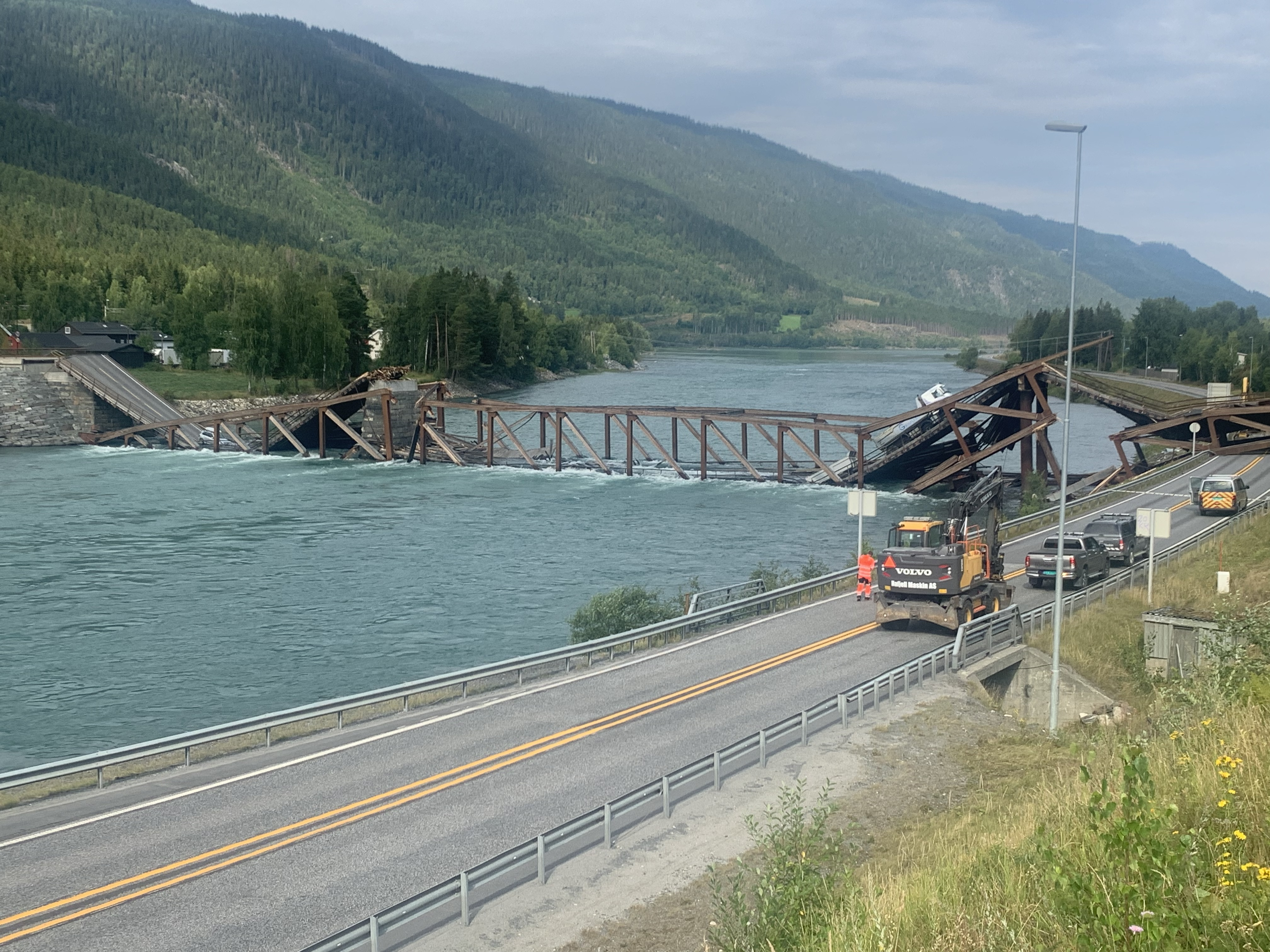
Tretten Bridge on the day of the collapse.

On the morning of 15 August 2022, Tretten bridge collapsed and fell into the river and onto the E6 road. A passenger car and a lorry with a trailer loaded with lime were on the bridge when it collapsed. The truck had a total weight of 48 tonnes (47 long tons; 53 short tons) (the bridge was approved for 50 tonnes (49 long tons; 55 short tons) for each vehicle). The driver of the car got out without assistance, while the driver of the truck remained in the cab for an hour until he was rescued by an ambulance helicopter.

Prior to the collapse, road users reported a kind of rocking when they were on the bridge at the same time as larger vehicles. The bridge underwent a thorough inspection in 2021 and a simpler inspection in June 2022 with no faults detected.

The collapse caused the E6 to be closed, and the old E6 route through the city centre was used until the main route was reopened on 26 August 2022. Access to the west side of the river, is via detours of at least 21 km (13 mi). Demolition of the bridge began on 17 August 2022. After the eastern end of the bridge had been lowered, the lorry with trailer was driven off the bridge under its own power on 22 August 2022 – one week after the bridge collapse.

The bridge was of the same type of construction as the Perkolo bridge at Sjoa, which collapsed in February 2016. The Perkolo bridge collapsed because it had an undersized joint. The Norwegian Road Administration then recommended strengthening the Tretten Bridge: "There are no design errors here, but according to the current regulations, the safety against certain brittle fracture mechanisms, which were previously controlled more indirectly, is too low."

Anders Rønnquist, professor of structural engineering, maintained that errors in planning, dimensioning or in the construction phase would normally have become apparent shortly after the bridge was opened, and he assumed instead that wear damage has occurred in the foundation. Tormod Dyken, retired chief engineer in the Norwegian Public Roads Administration, stated that the bridge was too new for rust or rot to be the cause. Dyken maintained that the bridge cracked in several places and therefore believed that the cause could be in the junctions where the inclined beams were attached to horizontal beams. The combination of steel and glulam in bridge-building is unusual: Wood and steel are affected differently by variations in temperature, humidity and weight load, and according to Dyken, this can create unexpected tensions in the construction that can lead to fatigue failure. Dyken believes that the bridge type may be insufficiently tested.

== Consequences ==
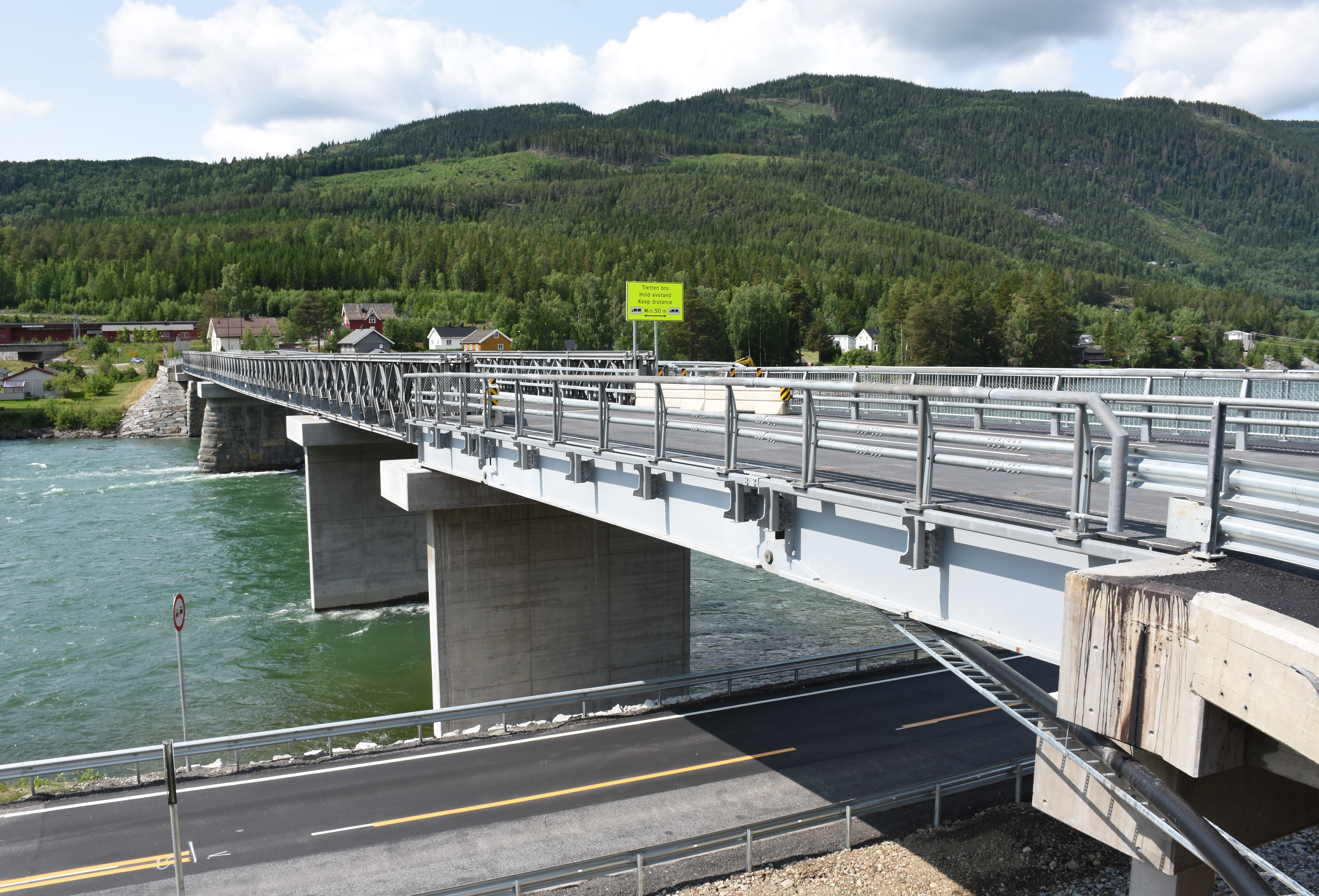
Replacement bridge, July 2023.

As of October 2022, a permit has been granted for construction of a replacement bridge; however, the permit stipulates that construction above the waterline must be finished by April 15, 2023, due to concerns about wildlife and no bridge will be in place until the spring of 2023. On 16 August 2022, the Norwegian Road Administration decided to close 14 wooden truss bridges, pending the cause of the bridge collapse. Ten of the bridges are the responsibility of the Norwegian Public Roads Administration, two are Viken county council responsibility and two are Innlandet county council responsibility. The National Road Administration's press release did not clarify if it has the authority to close county municipal bridges. The collapse was brought up in the Storting's Question Time. Innlandet county council (which owns the bridge and is responsible for the stretch of road) and the Swedish Road Administration launched an external investigation by an independent panel of professionals.

On 23 August 2022, the Norwegian Accident Investigation Board decided to carry out a full safety investigation of the bridge collapse. A preliminary report released in December 2022 concluded failure of a diagonal strut led to the collapse: "technical studies have shown that a break in one of the timber diagonals in the main span towards the western abutment led to the collapse. This was caused by a block shear failure at the timber and steel connection, one of several across the 150m-long bridge, causing overloading of other elements in the truss."
