= American Forest & Paper Association =

National trade association

- Formation: January 1, 1993; 33 years ago
- Chairman: F. Colin Moseley
- Website: afandpa.org

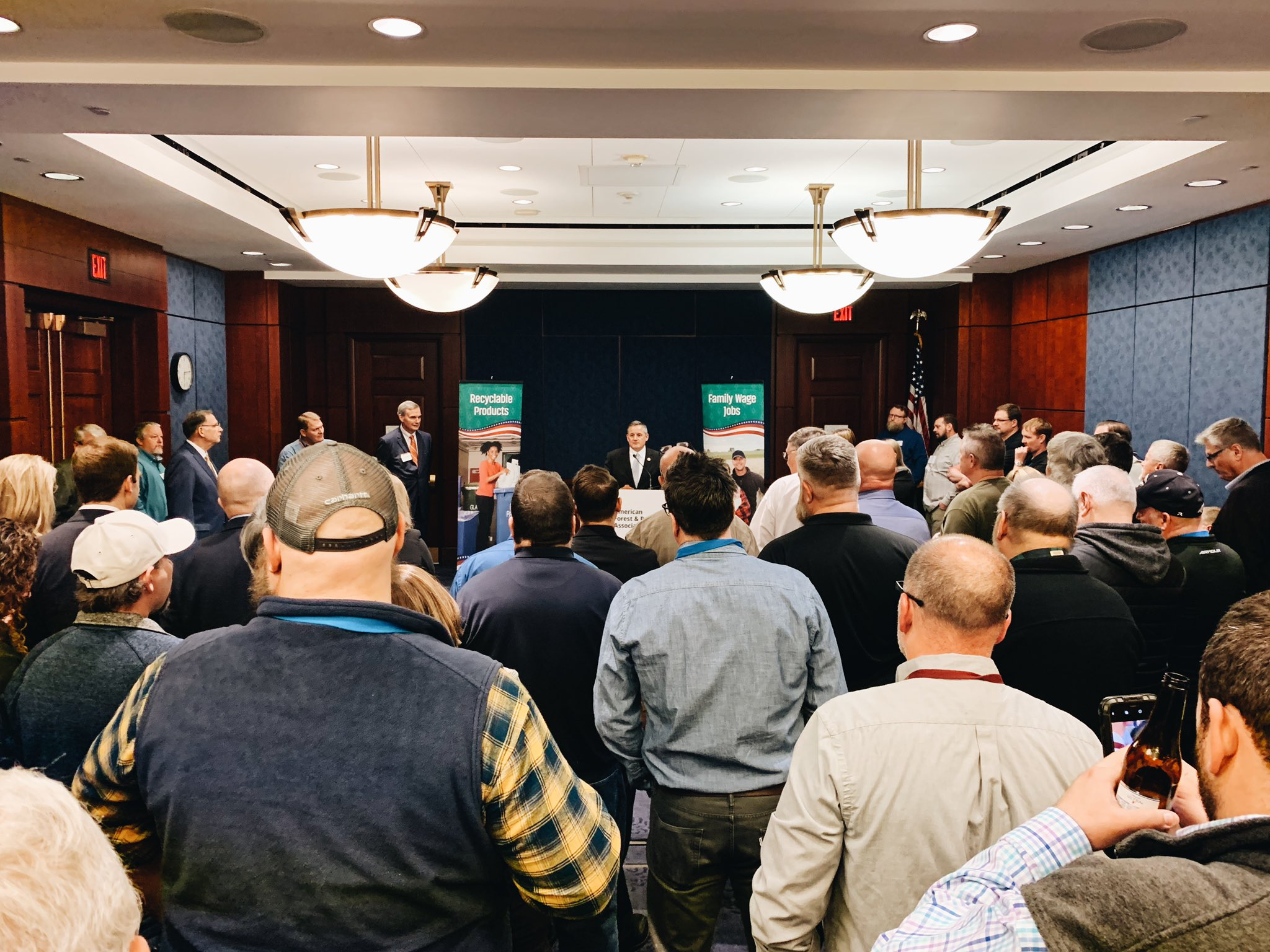
Congressman Bruce Westerman speaks at an AFPA event in 2020.

The American Forest & Paper Association (AF&PA) is the national trade association of the paper and wood products industry.

AF&PA was formed on January 1, 1993, by the merger of the National Forest Product Association and the American Paper Institute.

Membership includes scores of companies and industry associations. Among them are Domtar, Essity, Evergreen Packaging, LLC, Georgia-Pacific LLC, Graphic Packaging International, Green Bay Packaging Inc., Greif, Inc., International Paper Company, Packaging Corporation of America, Pratt Industries, Inc., Resolute Forest Products, Sappi North America, Sonoco Products Company and WestRock Company.

AF&PA's primary work is public policy advocacy at the international, national, state and local levels and, according to the Center for Public Integrity, it spent about $20 million from 1998 to 2004 on these efforts. The Association also serves as the forest products industry's primary statistical clearinghouse for manufacturing, production and capacity data. An AF&PA affiliate organization, the American Wood Council, promotes the use of wood building materials in residential and commercial construction and is an ANSI-accredited publisher of wood building codes.

== See also ==
- Forests of the United States
