= Norbord =

Former Canadian wood product manufacturer

Norbord Inc.
- Formerly: Noranda Forest; Nexfor
- Company type: Public
- Traded as: TSX: OSB; NYSE: OSB
- Industry: Forestry
- Genre: Engineered Wood Products
- Predecessor: Noranda Mines
- Defunct: February 1, 2021
- Fate: Acquired by West Fraser Timber
- Headquarters: Toronto, Ontario, Canada
- Key people: Peter Wijnbergen (CEO)
- Products: Oriented strand board, particleboard, medium-density fibreboard
- Number of employees: 2,700
- Website: www.norbord.com

Norbord Inc. was a Canadian company that manufactured wood-based panels and became the world's largest producer of oriented strand board (OSB). Norbord also manufactured particleboard, medium-density fibreboard (MDF) and related value-added products. Norbord had assets of approximately $1.7 billion and employs approximately 2,600 people at 17 plant locations in the United States, Canada and Europe.

== History ==
The company was formed as a corporate spin-off of Noranda Mines. Until it was acquired by West Fraser Timber, Norbord was listed on the Toronto Stock Exchange and New York Stock Exchange under the symbol "OSB".

== Structure ==
Norbord operates 13 OSB mills, 1 MDF (medium density fibreboard) plant, 2 particleboard (chipboard) plants and 1 furniture plant.

Its OSB mills in the US were located in Minnesota, Georgia (2 lines), Mississippi, Alabama, South Carolina and 2 in Texas. In Canada there were 2 mills in Alberta, 1 in British Columbia, 1 in Ontario and 2 in Québec. In Europe there were mills located in Inverness (2 lines) and Cowie (2 lines), Scotland, in South Molton, England as well as in Genk, Belgium.

The MDF plant was located in Cowie, Scotland.

Its particleboard lines were located in Cowie, Scotland and South Molton, England.

Norbord's furniture factory was based in South Molton, England.

Both lines in Inverness as well as the line in Genk produced OSB.
