= I-joist =

Engineered wood joist

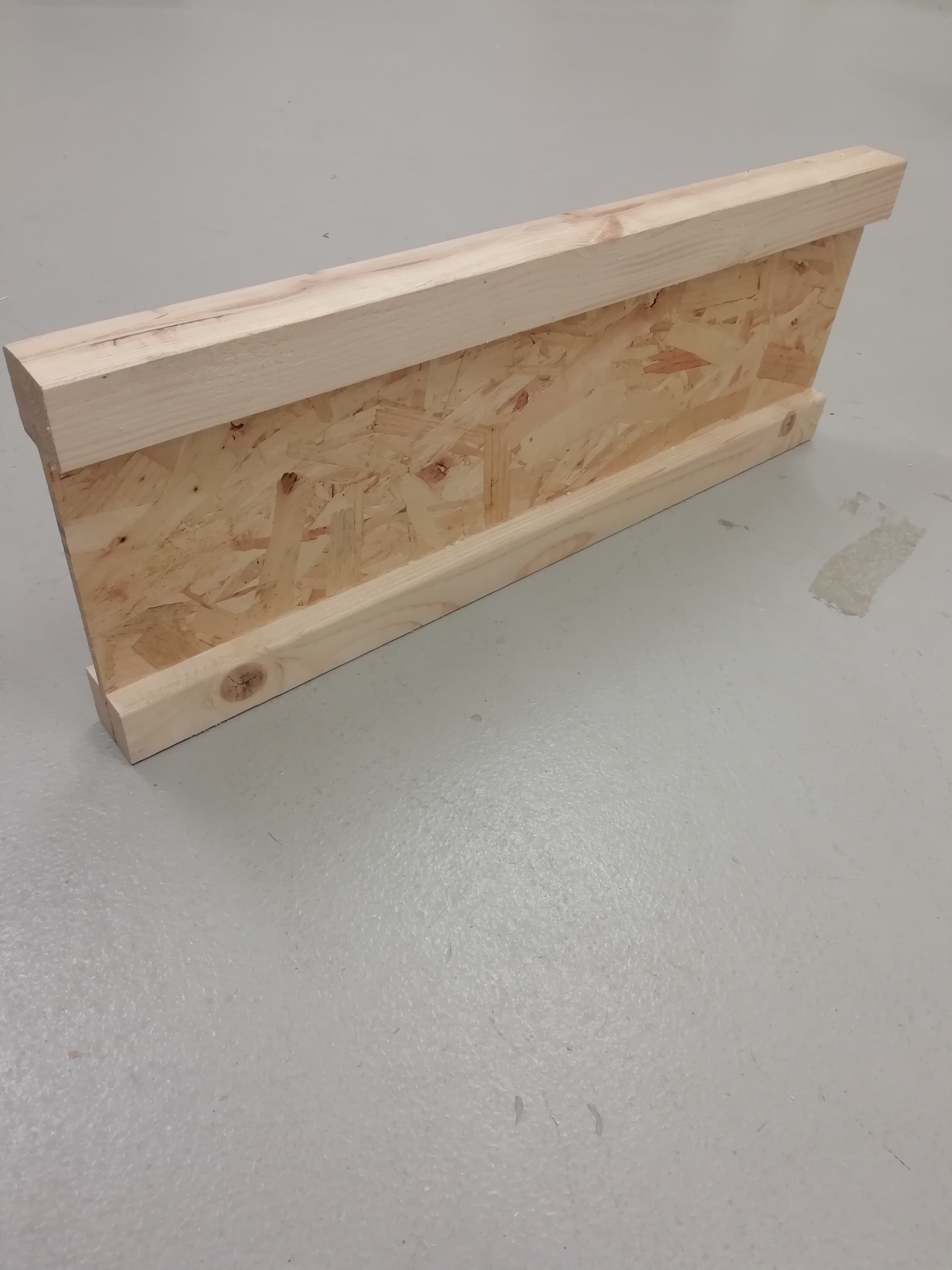
An I-joist

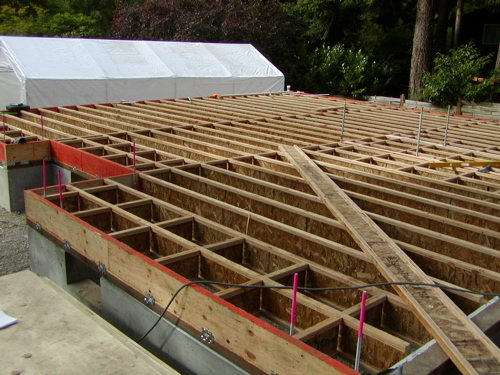
A partially constructed floor built with I-joists

An I-joist is designed to eliminate problems that occur with conventional wood joists. Invented in 1969, the I-joist is an engineered wood product that has great strength in relation to its size and weight. The biggest notable difference from dimensional lumber is that the I-joist carries heavy loads with less lumber than a dimensional solid wood joist. As of 2005, approximately 50% of all wood light framed floors used I-joists. I-joists were designed to help eliminate typical problems that come with using solid lumber as joists.

The advantage of I-joists is they are less likely to bow, crown, twist, cup, check, or split as would a piece of dimensional lumber. I-joists' dimensional soundness and little or no shrinkage help eliminate squeaky floors.

The disadvantage of I-joists is very rapid structural failure when directly exposed to fire (much like trusses), reducing the time available for residents to escape and increasing the danger to firefighters.

== Design and manufacture ==
An I-joist has two main parts, the web and flange. The web is sandwiched between a top and bottom flange, creating the "I" shape. The flange can be made from laminated veneer lumber or solid wood finger-jointed together for ultimate strength. It is grooved on one side to receive the web. The web is typically made from plywood, laminated veneer lumber, or oriented strand board. After sizing the webs and flanges, they are assembled with water-resistant glue by pressing the web into the top and bottom flange. After assembly, the I-joist is end-trimmed and heat-cured or left at room temperature to reach approximately equilibrium moisture content. Sizes vary according to the I-joist's intended load and span. Depths can range from 9 1/4 to 24 inches (230–610 mm) and reach up to 80 feet (24 m) in length, although 40 to 42 feet (12–13 m) is more common. The intended use for an I-joist is for floor and roof joists, wall studs, and roof rafters in both residential and commercial construction.

== Installation ==
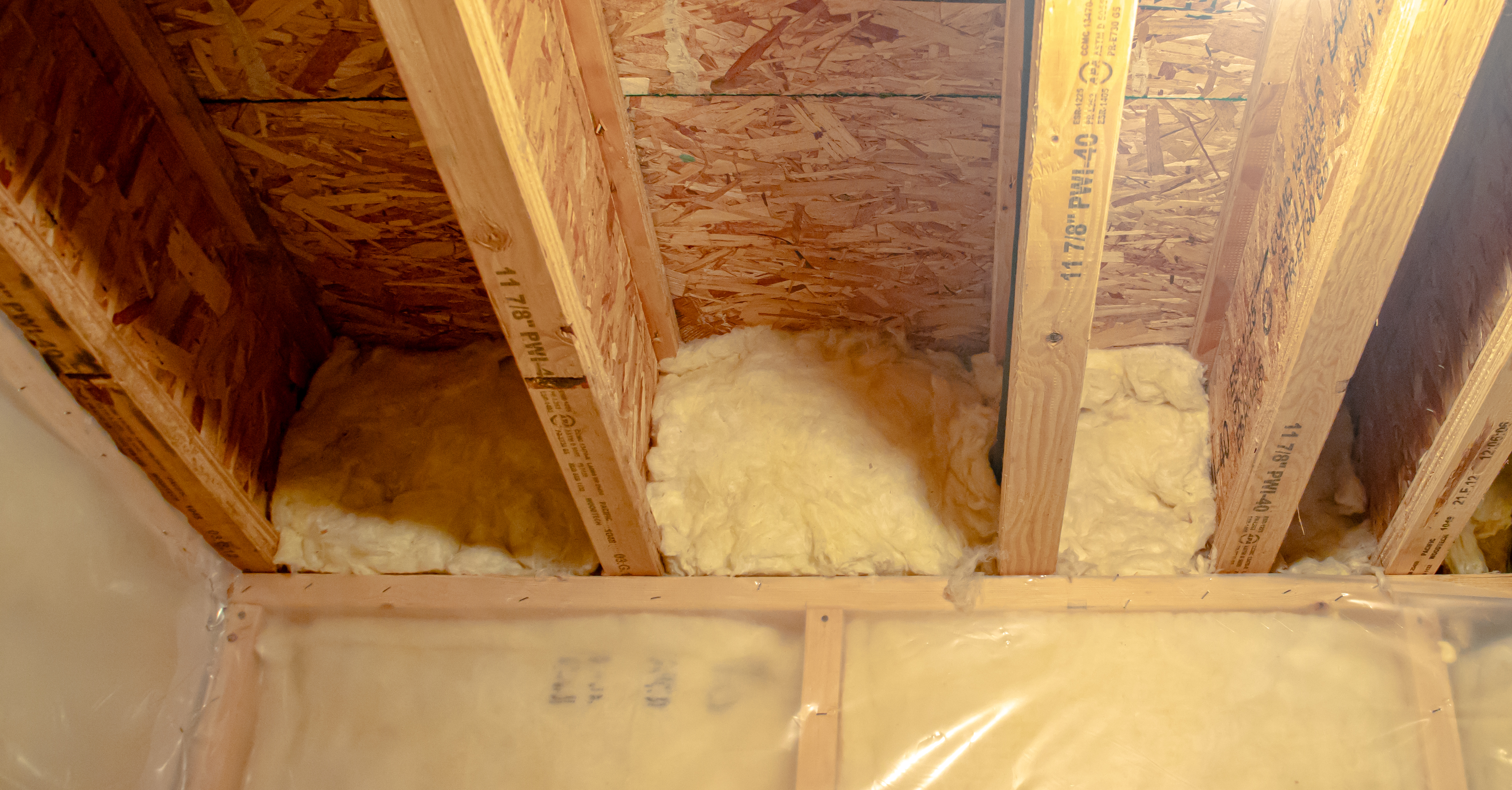
I-joist

I-joists require correct installation. The most common mistake is misplacing or improperly sizing holes in the web, which can compromise the joist's strength, potentially leading to structural failure.

Common mistakes made with installing I-joists include cutting or chiseling the flange, improperly sized joist hangers, improper nailing and wrong-sized nails. The rim joist depth must match the I-joist size. Mismatches can strain the joist.

A similar situation occurs where the I-joist crosses a main beam. Installing squash blocks (2×4 materials 1/16 in or 1.6 mm higher than the I-joist) alongside the I-joists transfers the load from the I-joist onto the beam. Missed nails and glue setting too fast can lead to an uneven or squeaky floor.

== Safety ==
The lightweight nature of I-joists makes them more vulnerable to fire than dimensional lumber. A report by Underwriters Laboratories found that structural assemblies composed of I-joists fail significantly sooner under fire conditions than those composed of dimensional lumber. Fire-induced failures of lightweight trusses and I-joists have led to the deaths of several firefighters. In order to use i-joists in a fire-rated assembly, additional detailing is required to ensure building safety.

== See also ==
- I-beam
