= Pugmill =

Machine to mix clay or other materials

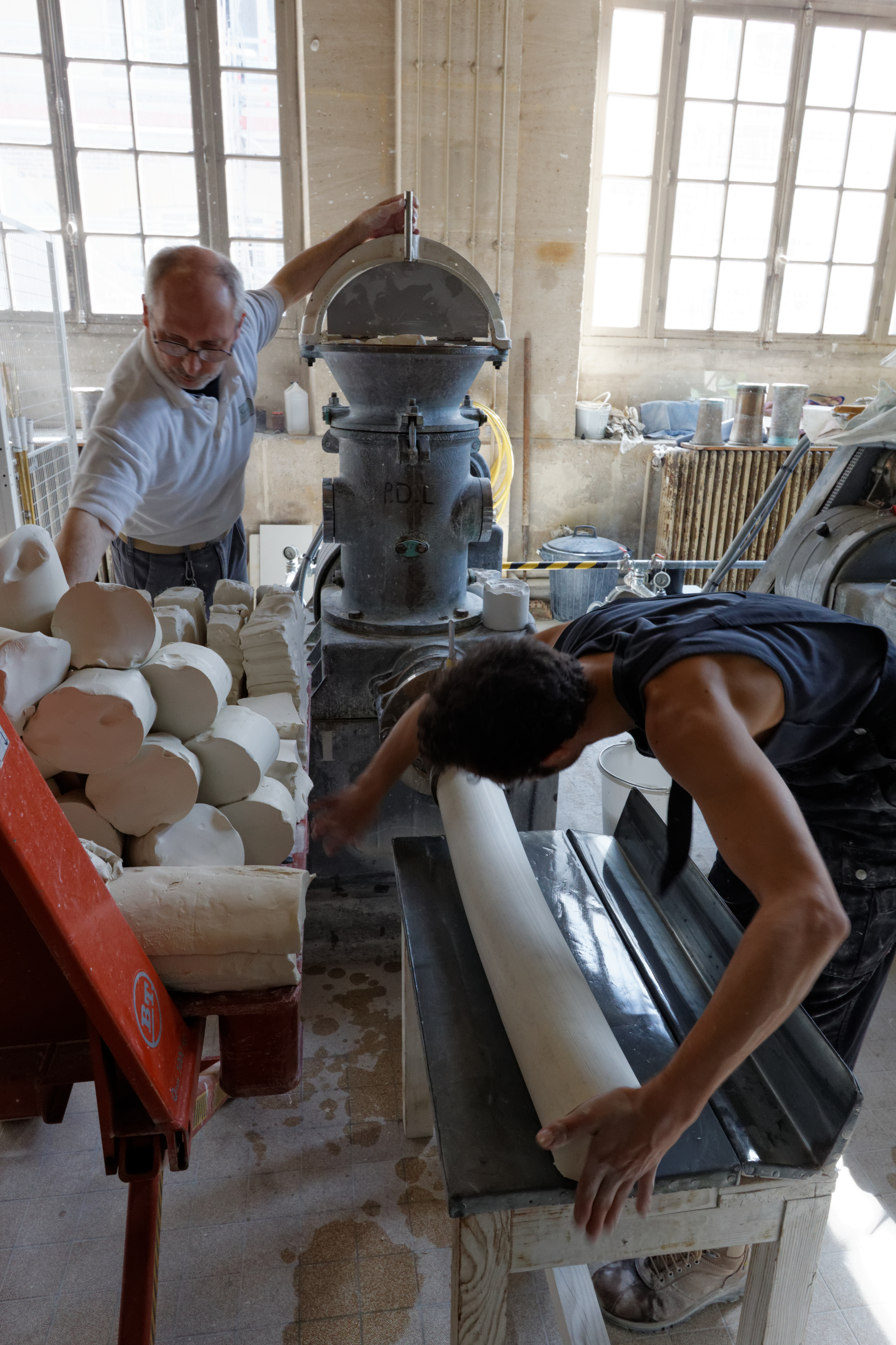
Clay body being extruded from a de-airing pug

A pugmill, pug mill, or pug is a machine in which clay or other materials are extruded in a plastic state or a similar machine for the trituration of ore. Industrial applications are found in pottery, bricks, cement and some parts of the concrete and asphalt mixing processes. A pugmill may be a fast continuous mixer. A continuous pugmill can achieve a thoroughly mixed, homogeneous mixture in a few seconds, and the right machines can be matched to the right application by taking into account the factors of agitation, drive assembly, inlet, discharge, cost and maintenance. Mixing materials at optimum moisture content requires the forced mixing action of the pugmill paddles, while soupy materials might be mixed in a drum mixer. A typical pugmill consists of a horizontal boxlike chamber with a top inlet and a bottom discharge at the other end, 2 shafts with opposing paddles, and a drive assembly. Some of the factors affecting mixing and residence time are the number and the size of the paddles, paddle swing arc, overlap of left and right swing arc, size of mixing chamber, length of pugmill floor, and material being mixed.

== Common construction and industrial uses ==
Road Base - Dense well-graded aggregate, uniformly mixed, wetted, and densely compacted for building the foundation under a pavement.

Lime Addition to asphalt – Lime may be added to the cold feed of an asphalt plant to strengthen the binding properties of the asphalt.

Flyash Conditioning – Wetting fly ash in a pugmill to stabilize the ash so that it won’t create dust. Some flyashes have cementitious properties when wetted and can be used to stabilize other materials.

Waste stabilization – various waste streams are remediated with pugmills forcing the mixing of the wastes with remediation agents.

Roller-compacted concrete – (RCC) or rolled concrete is a special blend of concrete that has the same ingredients as conventional concrete but in different ratios. It has cement, water, and aggregates, but RCC is much drier and essentially has no slump. RCC is placed in a manner similar to paving, often by dump trucks or conveyors, spread by bulldozers or special modified asphalt pavers. After placement it is compacted by vibratory rollers. The “stiff” nature of RCC may require a paddle type pugmill to force the materials to mix completely and discharge easily.

Ceramics pug mills, or commonly just "pugs", are not used to grind or mix, rather they extrude clay bodies prior to shaping processes. Some can be fitted with a vacuum system that ensures the extruded clay bodies have no entrapped air. According to the 1913 edition of Webster's Dictionary, a clay pug mill typically consists of an upright shaft armed with projecting knives, which is caused to revolve in a hollow cylinder, tub, or vat, in which the clay body is placed.

Pugmills that run intermittently are used in the kaolin mining industry to mix certain grades of kaolin clay with water.

== See also ==
- Concrete slump test
