= Parallel-strand lumber =

Form of engineered wood

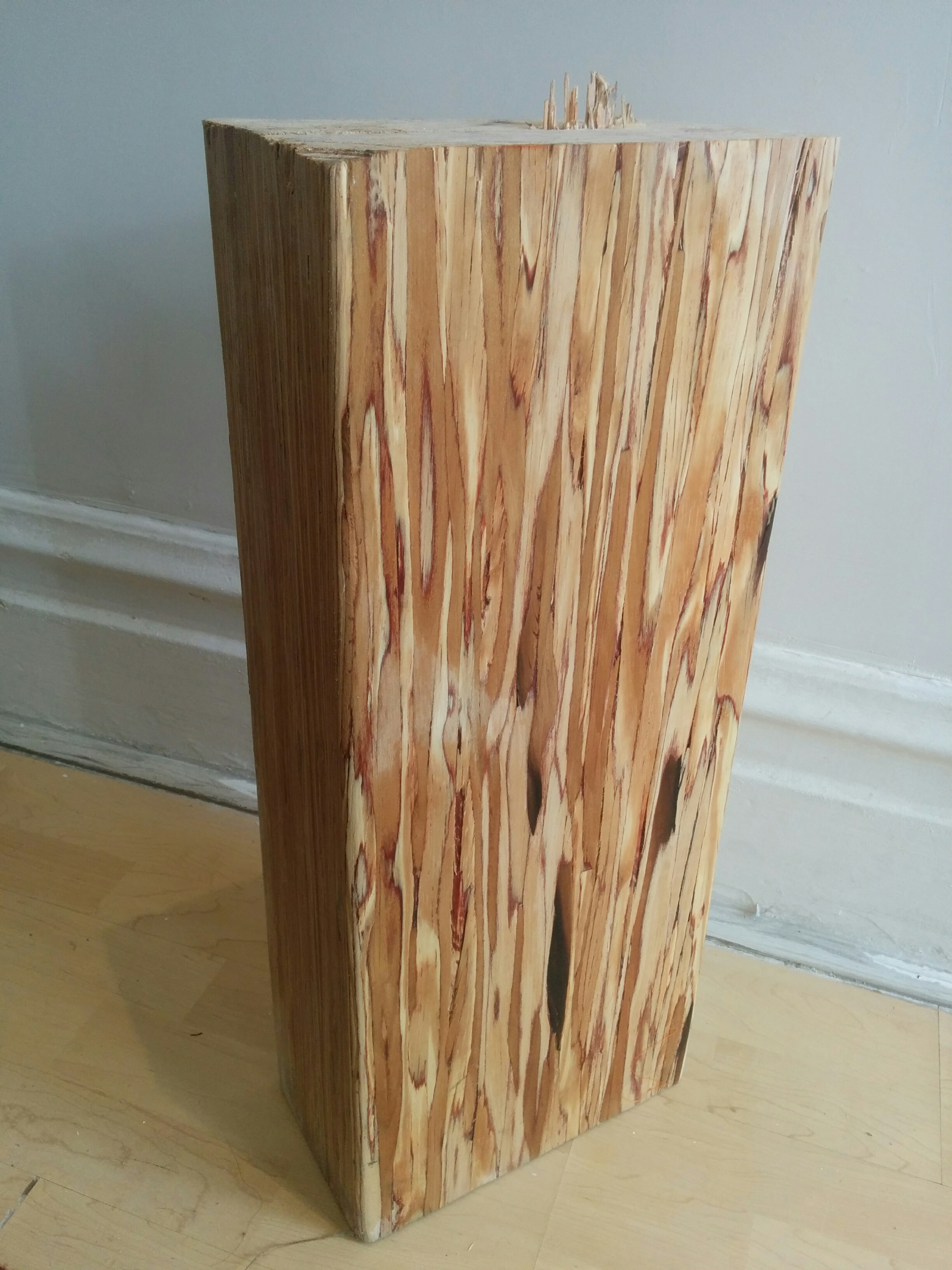
A PSL block

Parallel-strand lumber (PSL) is a form of engineered wood made from parallel wood strands bonded together with adhesive. It is used for beams, headers, columns, and posts, among other uses. The strands in PSL are clipped veneer elements having a least dimension of not more than 1/4 inch (6.4 mm) and an average length of at least 300 times this least dimension (around 6 ft or 1.8 m). It is a member of the structural composite lumber (SCL) family of engineered wood products.

The design strength of PSL is greater than that of sawn lumber as the strands are glued together directionally and under high pressure. This results in a much denser and stronger material. Because knots and other imperfections are randomly dispersed throughout the product (and filled up and fortified with glue) strength variability from one piece of PSL to another is less than in solid-sawn wooden beams. Since wooden construction materials are commonly graded to the lowest 5th percentile of the material's strength curve, PSL has much higher usable values for bending, tension parallel to grain, and compression parallel to grain.

The invention, development, commercialisation and patent of PSL, using timber forest thinnings, dates prior to Parallam, back to the CSIRO's Division of Chemical and Wood Technology in 1976 and, since September 1977, Repco Ltd, and its subsidiary Repco Research Pty Ltd, in consultation with CSIRO.

The product was known by the name Scrimber, and is described in a 1980 video produced by CSIRO during the development phase at Repco Research Pty Ltd., and the CSIRO 1986 published book – Scrimber: A New Engineering Wood Product. The technology licence was subsequently transferred to the then newly formed Scrimber International in 1985 – Scrimber International being a joint venture between the SA Timber Corporation and the SA State Government Insurance Commission.

It is likely that the Parallam product, which uses parallel shaved veneers instead of linear crushing to form the parallel fibre structures, was developed from the technology licensed from CSIRO and commercially exploited by Scrimber International as noted in the Popular Mechanics May 1990 article pages 96–99. The history of the Scrimber patents found at Google Patents (European), was based upon the Australian Patent Priority claimed from AUPG251683, and expired in 2004,

Parallam is the brand name for the product invented, developed, commercialized and patented by MacMillan Bloedel (now Weyerhaeuser). It is the world's only commercially manufactured and marketed parallel-strand lumber product. PSL can be made from any wood species, but Douglas fir, southern pine, western hemlock, and yellow poplar are commonly chosen because of their superior strength.

The product is manufactured as a 12-by-12-inch (300 mm × 300 mm) or 12-by-18-inch (300 mm × 460 mm) billet in a rectangular cross-section, which is then typically sawn and trimmed to smaller cross-sectional sizes. The beams are continuously formed, so the length of the beam is limited only to the maximum length that can be handled and transported. Typical widths are 3 1/2, 5 1/4 or 7 inches (89, 133 or 178 mm); typical depths are 9 1/2, 11 7/8, 14, 16 and 18 inches (240, 300, 360, 410 and 460 mm). Typically the beams are made to a maximum length of 60 feet (18 m).

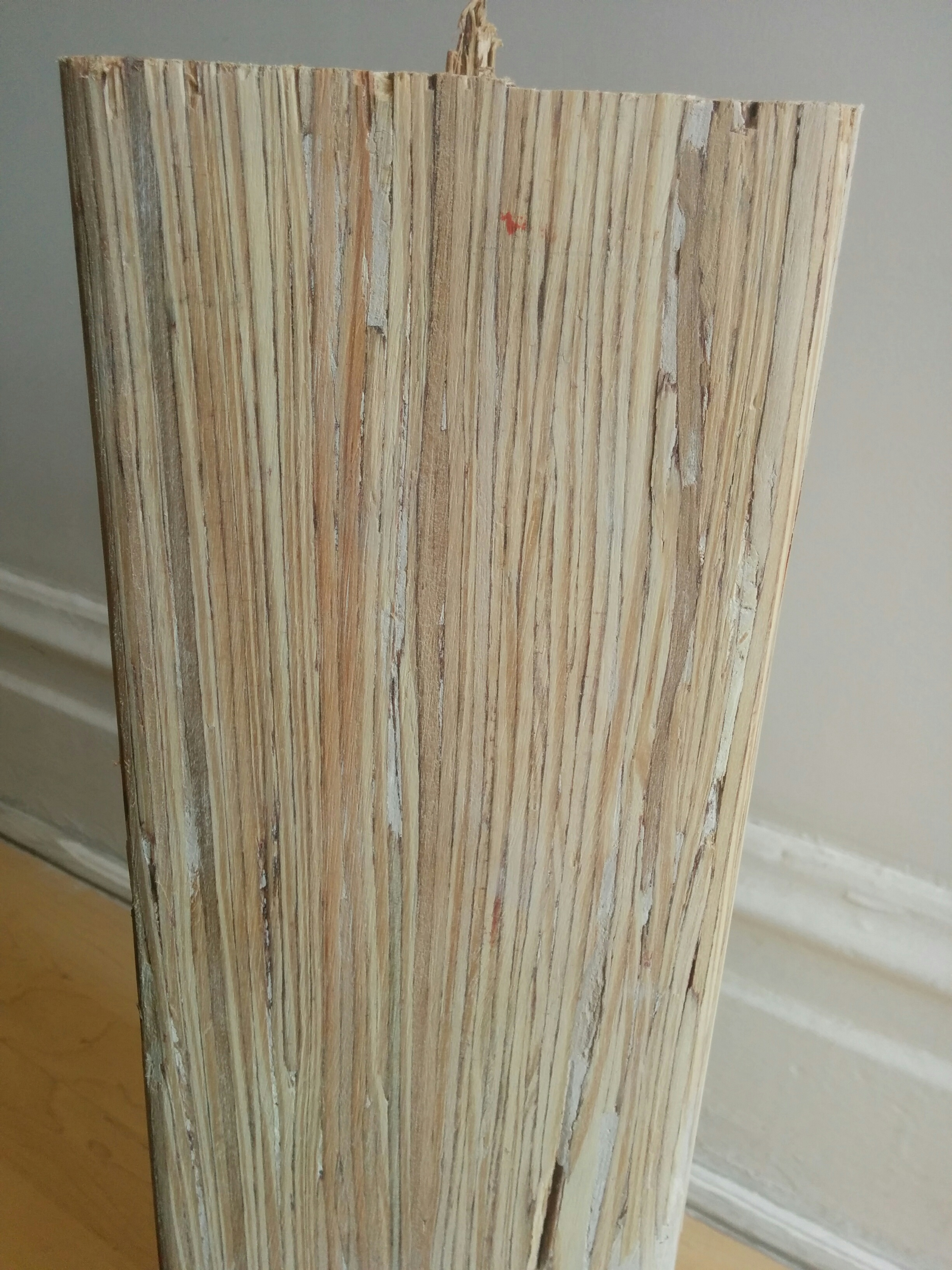
PSL grain from the side

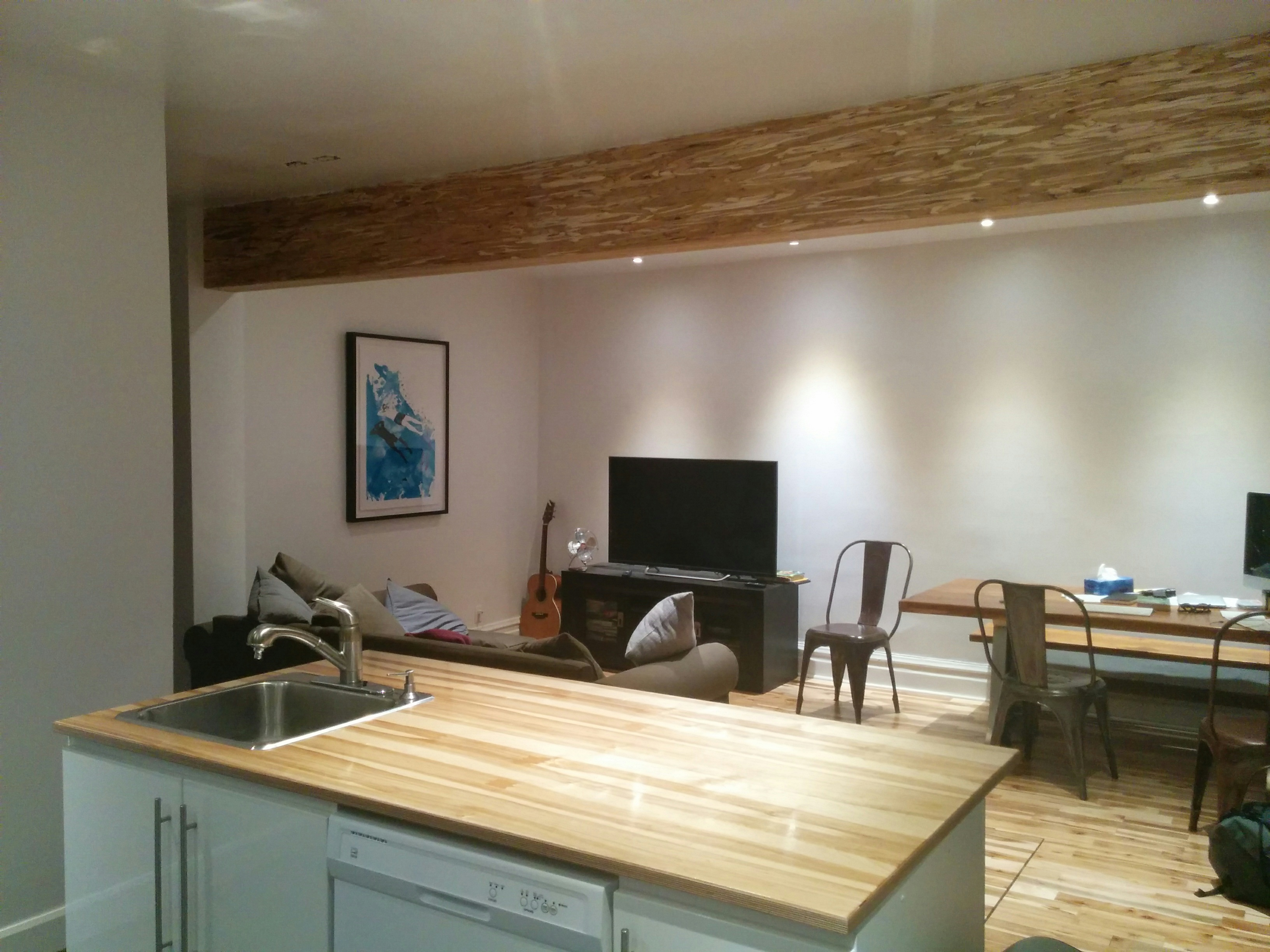
A beam of PSL installed in an apartment

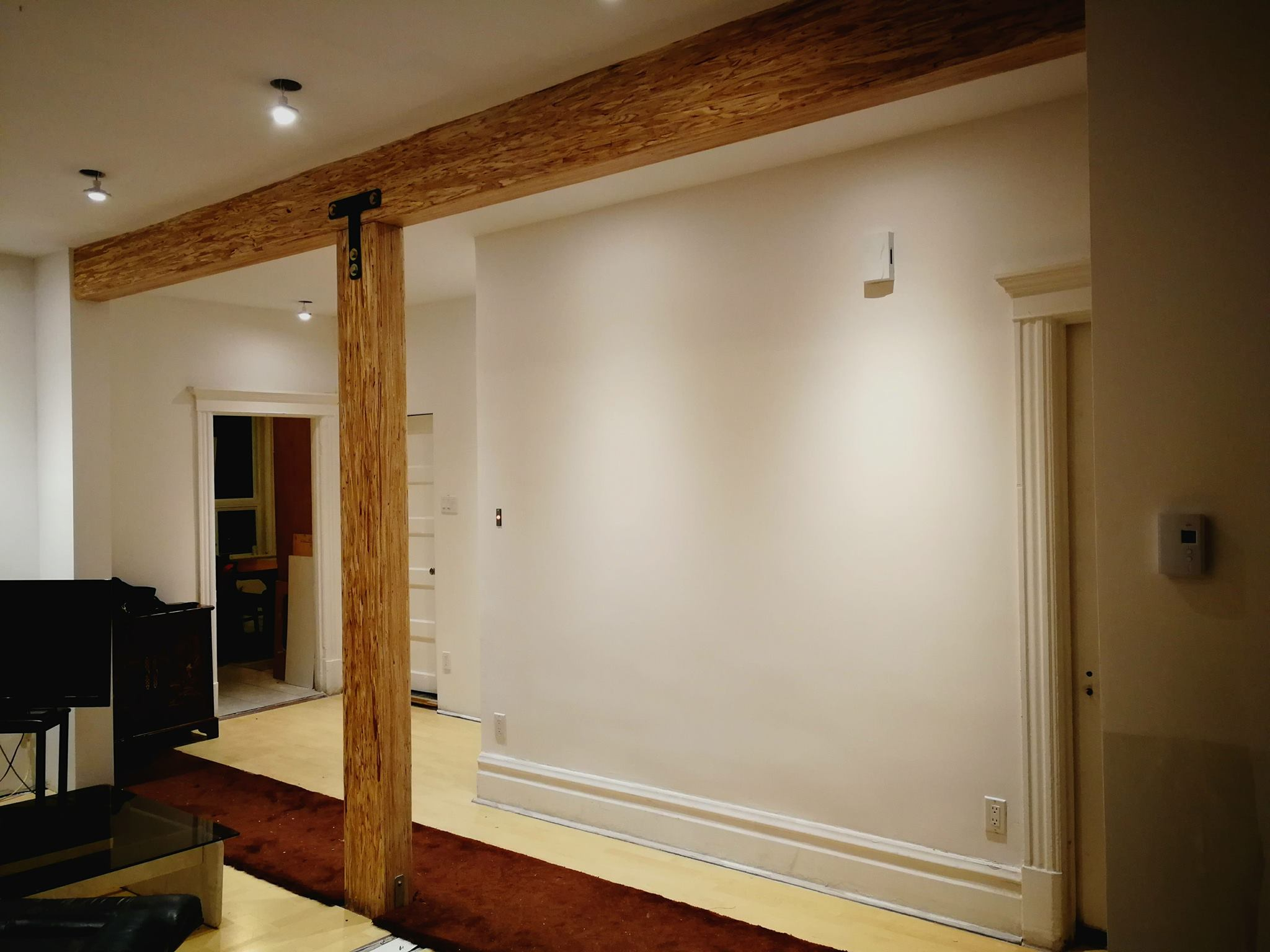
An apartment with an exposed PSL beam and column
