= Mjøstårnet =

Wood hybrid building in Norway

Coordinates: 60°52′39″N 10°55′51″E

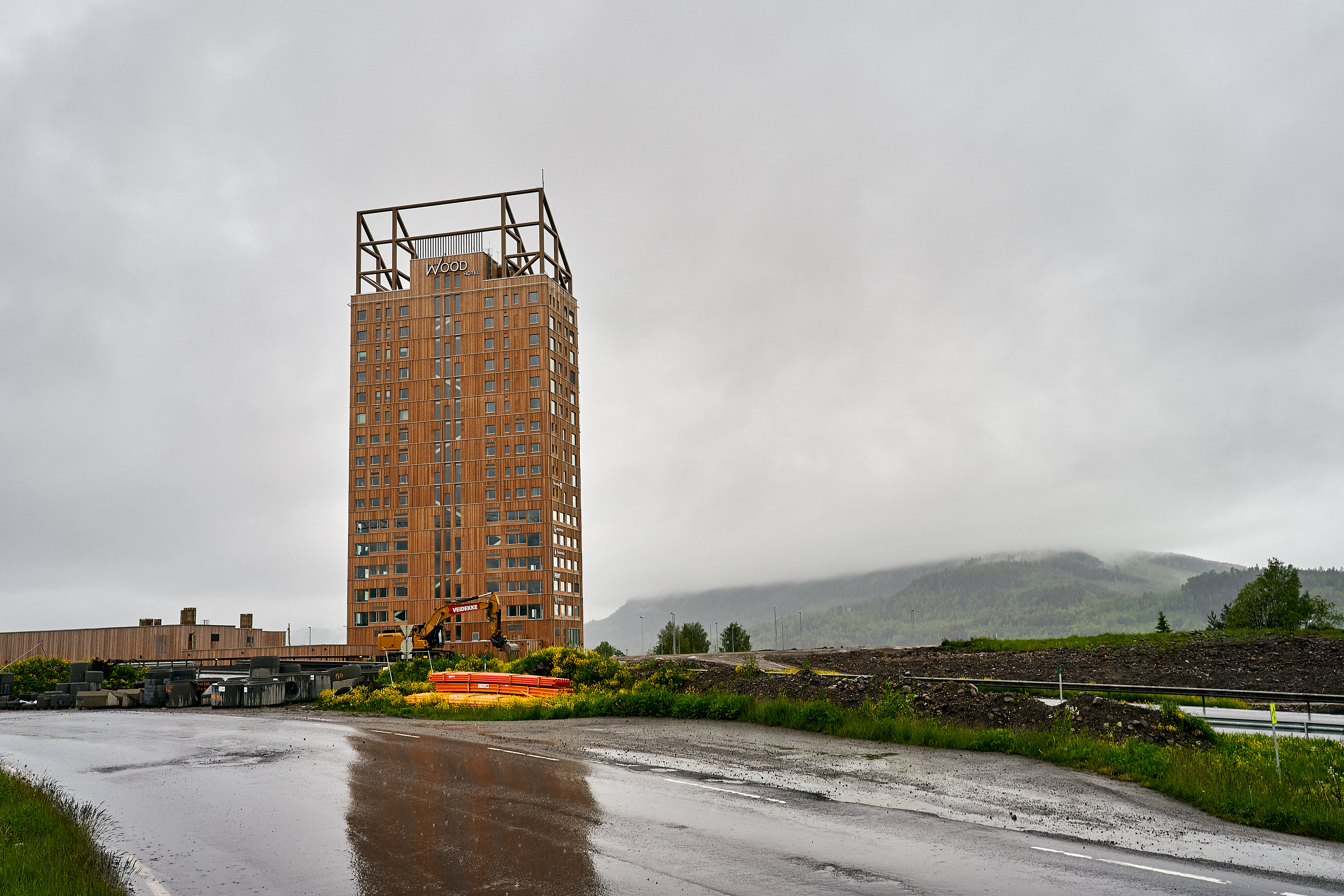
Tower at Lake Mjøsa 2019

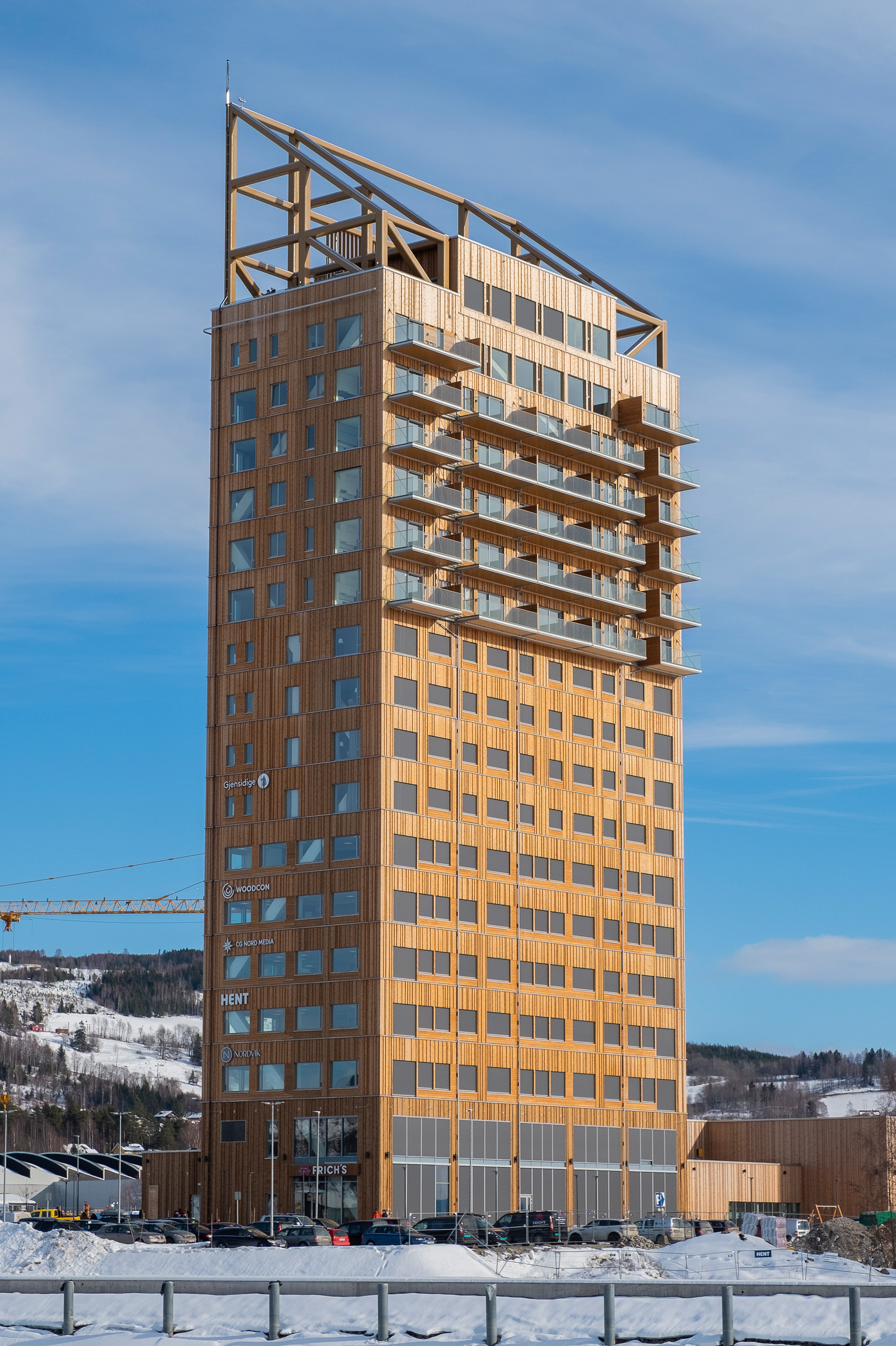
Mjøstårnet in March 2019.

Mjøstårnet (Norwegian for the tower of Mjøsa) is an 18-storey mixed-use building in Brumunddal, Norway, completed in March 2019. At the time of completion, it was officially the world's tallest wooden building, at 85.4 m (280 ft) tall, before being surpassed by Ascent MKE in August 2022. The building is named after Norway's biggest lake, which is 100 km away from Oslo.

Mjøstårnet has a combined floor area of around 11,300 m^{2} (122,000 sq ft). The building offers a hotel, apartments, offices, a restaurant and common areas, as well as a swimming pool in the adjacent first-floor extension. This is about 4,700 m^{2} (51,000 sq ft) in size and also built in wood.

== Design ==
Mjøstårnet was designed by Norwegian studio Voll Arkitekter for AB Invest. Timber structures were installed by Norwegian firm Moelven Limtre, including load-bearing structures in glued laminated timber. Cross laminated timber were used for stairwells, elevator shafts and balconies.

As the main vertical/lateral structural elements and the floor spanning systems of Mjøstårnet are constructed from timber, the building is considered an all-timber structure. An all-timber structure may include the use of localized non-timber connections between timber elements. It may also include non-timber floors as long as the decks are supported by a primary structure made in timber (resting on timber beams). In Mjøstårnet, concrete slabs were used on the top seven floors in order to handle comfort criteria and acoustics.

== Notable examples ==
The next tallest wooden building is the 84 m (276 ft), 24-storey high HoHo Tower in Vienna, Austria. However, this building is a timber-concrete composite building since it has a concrete core stabilizing the building, according to the definition of CTBUH.

The Japanese wood products company Sumitomo Forestry is proposing to build the W350 Project a 350 m (1,150 ft), 70-floor tower to commemorate its 350th anniversary in 2041.
