= Howard Liddell (architect) =

Howard Laurence Liddell (7 June 1945 – 23 February 2013) was a British architect who was a pioneer of sustainable development and passive housing. He has been called "one of the most influential green architects of his generation". He was principal of Gaia Architects, which pioneered ecologically friendly and brettstapel design. He was awarded an OBE in the 2013 New Year Honours list but died before he was due to collect it.

== Life ==
He was born in Askrigg, Wensleydale in Yorkshire, England but raised in Newcastle upon Tyne and later Edinburgh. He studied at Edinburgh School of Architecture, graduating with a first-class degree. He worked as an architect for a few years before taking up an academic position at Hull School of Architecture in 1971, where he was a lecturer and then director of research. From 1979 he was a guest lecturer and later guest professor at the University of Oslo.

In 1996 he moved back to Edinburgh where he co-founded the Gaia Group, which combined environmentally focused architecture, engineering and research, and was Principal of their architecture division. He chaired the RIBA Architecture and Ecology Group from 1974 to 1979, and founded the Scottish Ecological Design Association in 1991.

He was married to fellow architect Sandy Halliday, and they had 4 children. He died of cancer on 23 February 2013.

== Gaia Architects ==
Led by Liddell, Gaia Architecture produced a number of important and sustainable buildings in Scotland, including Acharacle Primary School, Glentress Forest Visitor Centre and Plummerswood.

Liddell was principal and project architect for Glencoe Visitor Centre in Glen Coe near Fort William, Scotland, despite being highly critical of ecological tourism as "an oxymoron – you only explain what it is they are about to trample on". It was built in untreated timber without any glue or PVC to minimise pollution, and with ungalvanised corrugated tin roofing. It is modeled after a clachan, and was built in a brownfield site near a campsite, landscaped to fit in with the surroundings and preserve existing trees. It won a Royal Institution of Chartered Surveyors sustainability award in 2003 and VisitScotland Green Tourism Award in 2002.

Tressour Wood house at Weem in Perthshire, Scotland was built entirely from timber, and designed to be heated largely by the sun. It won a UK house of the year award.

Acharacle Primary School, Argyll, Scotland also used a largely wooden construction, with natural ventilation and minimal heating requirements. It was the first brettstapel (glue-less) building in the United Kingdom.

Plummerswood was a house in the Scottish borders overlooking the River Tweed constructed from glue-free timber.

== Publications ==
His book Eco-minimalism – The Antidote to Eco-bling (2008) criticised the tendency to add "eco-cliches" such as solar cells, micro wind turbines, and other expensive technologies rather than take the simple approach and build to reduce energy requirements. He criticised wind turbines, particularly in urban settings, as producing a tiny percentage of the stated output specification.
