= Stadthaus =

Residential building in London, England

Coordinates: 51.5308°N 0.0894°W

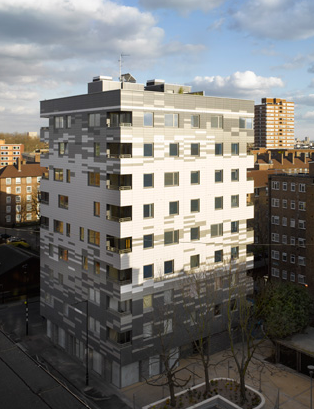
- Stadthaus, Murray Grove in 2014

General information
- Status: Completed
- Location: London, 24 Murray Grove
- Construction started: 2007
- Completed: 2009

Height
- Architectural: 29 m (95 ft)
- Tip: 30.3 m (99 ft)
- Top floor: 26 m (85 ft)

Technical details
- Material: Timber
- Floor count: 9
- Floor area: 2,890 m^{2} (31,100 sq ft)
- Lifts/elevators: 2

Design and construction
- Architect: Waugh Thistleton Architects
- Developer: Telford Homes
- Structural engineer: Techniker Ltd
- Main contractor: Telford Homes

Other information
- Parking: 5

Stadthaus is a nine-storey residential building in Hackney, London, completed in 2009. With nine stories (30 meters/98 feet), it was considered the second tallest timber residential building made of wood in the world at the time of its construction, after the Forte apartment complex in Melbourne, Australia. It was designed in collaboration between architects Waugh Thistleton, structural engineers Techniker, and timber panel manufacturer KLH.

Stadthaus is the first high-density housing building to be built from pre-fabricated cross-laminated timber panels. It is the first building in the world of this height to construct not only load-bearing walls and floor slabs but also stair and lift cores entirely from timber.

The record was later broken by Mjøstårnet in 2019 and the Ascent MKE high-rise apartment-building in 2022.

== Ecological aspects ==
Timber stores 0.8t of carbon dioxide within 1 cubic metre and is a replenishable material. In comparison, the production of both concrete and steel are one-way energy intensive processes that release large amounts of carbon dioxide into the atmosphere. The panels can also be easily demounted and used as an energy source at the end of the building’s life. So the case for timber was made to the client and London Borough of Hackney's planning department both in terms of the environmental consideration and potential economies to cost and programme.

== Design approach ==
The form of the design was predetermined by a number of factors. Previous architects had received two planning refusals on the site and as a result the acceptable parameters for the building’s approval were clearly defined. The site area is 17m x 17m and bound on all sides by other residential buildings. An extrusion of the site area set the building’s plan form and the height at nine stories was set as a maximum, before overshadowing would become an issue.

The Metropolitan Housing Trust required that a separate ground floor entrance be provided for the affordable units. This resulted in a mirrored floor plan from east to west, with an identical entrance to each aspect. Both tenures are served by an individual staircase and lift. The five upper stories are designated for private sale and the three lower stories for social housing. The majority of social housing is made up of family apartments which overlook the play area to the rear of the building.

Telford Homes specifically required that the interiors were consistent with a standard developer specification, which means that inside the apartments feel completely conventional, belying the revolutionary nature of their structure.

According to the architects, the colour scheme of the exterior façade was inspired by Gerhard Richter’s painting Les gris entre ciel et mer du nord.

=== Construction method ===
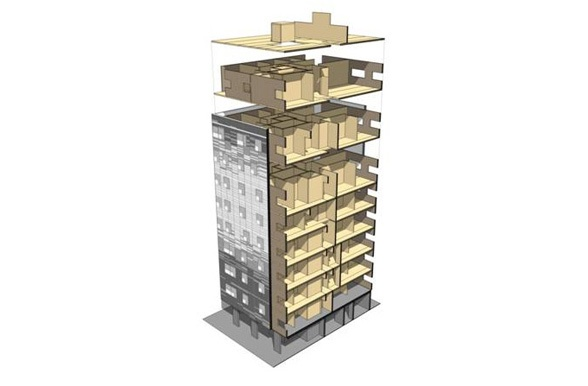
Cross-Section of Stadthaus

The building was assembled using a structural cross-laminated timber panel system. The timber panels are produced in Austria by KLH using Spruce planks glued together with a non-toxic adhesive. The waste timber is converted to fuel powering both the factory and local village. Each panel is prefabricated including cut-outs for windows and doors and routed service channels. As the panels arrived on site they were immediately craned into position and fixed in place. Four carpenters assembled the eight-story structure in twenty-seven days. The speed of the construction in such a densely populated environment is especially relevant, as was the lack of noise and waste, creating far less intrusion on the local community than a traditional concrete frame construction.

A ‘platform construction’ configuration is used throughout this structure. Each floor is set on the walls below, and then another story of walls is raised and so on up the building. Joints are secured with screws and angle plates. Stresses are generally very low throughout the structure and at points where cross-grain pressures are high, screws have been added to reinforce the timber locally. Progressive collapse is avoided by providing sufficient redundancy so that any single elements can be removed. Designing a building constructed from load bearing panels creates a number of opportunities. Any internal wall can become a party wall and have a significant portion removed from the surface area as openings. This simple flexibility allowed for different plan types up and down the building and an animated façade where windows were placed according to the best advantage.

Typically a new technology in construction provides a reduced volume of building material; lighter weights produce cheaper faster buildings. The impression of solidity once inside this building is evident, the interior spaces and the acoustic they give off affirm a sense of place and home.

Traditional trades and methods followed on once the structure of each floor was complete. The enthusiasm of the work force for the construction and the ease of the build was a benefit beyond anticipation. The building was completed in 49 weeks, estimated to be a saving of five months over a notional concrete frame construction and occupied ahead of programme in January 2009.

=== Sustainability ===
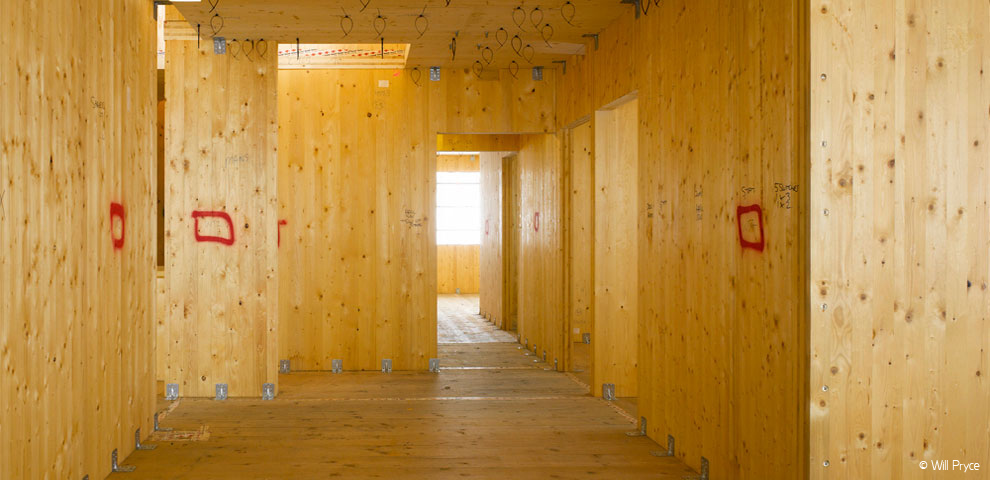
Internal Structure

Using a bulk timber panel system affects the carbon footprint of the building in three ways. Firstly, the production of cement produces 237 kg of carbon per tonne. The project's sustainability expert estimates that if this building were to be a concrete structure, it would contain approximately 950 cubic metres of concrete. This would require 285 tonnes of cement and would, therefore, produce approximately 67,500 kg of carbon.

Additionally, the production of steel produces 477 kg of carbon per tonne. It is estimated that the building would, if built in reinforced concrete, require about 120 tonnes of steel, the production of which would have generated 57,250 kg of carbon.

901 cubic metres of timber have been used within the building. Timber absorbs carbon throughout its natural life and continues to store that carbon when cut. The fabric of Stadthaus stores over 186,000 kg of carbon. Thus, the chosen construction method has resulted in a reduction in the carbon load of the building of 67,500 + 57,250 + 186,000 = 310,750 kg of carbon. This is equivalent to over 310 tonnes of carbon. The estimated carbon dioxide produced in the generation of the energy for the building, including the transportation of the timber panels from Austria, is 10,000 kg/c/yr. This has been entirely offset by the building’s carbon saving for some 21 years.

=== Building high in timber ===
Concerns associated with timber buildings are predominantly related to acoustics and fire protection. Timber buildings are classified as poor in terms of their acoustic performance due to the light structure as compared to reinforced concrete and masonry. However, cross-laminated solid timber panels have a significantly higher density than timber frame buildings. They provide a solid structural core on which different, independent and separating layers can be added. The layer principal overcomes any acoustic or sound transfer issues. In Stadthaus an economic layering strategy of stud walls, floating floor build-ups and suspended ceilings, gave sound attenuation far in excess of building regulations (58 - 60db).

In a fire, a solid wall of timber benefits from the protection of a charred layer and therefore does not combust in the same way as a single stud. In Stadthaus, five-layer cross-laminated timber panels are used to obtain a fire protection that allows the structure to retain its integrity for at least 90 minutes. This is significantly longer than steel, which fails and buckles at high temperatures. The 90 minutes at Stadthaus have been achieved with the plasterboard finish – two layers of plasterboard provide 60 minutes with the final 30 minutes achieved by the calculation of charring rate of the KLH solid timber panels. Calculations by the project engineers however show that in fact the KLH panels comfortably achieve a 60-minute fire resistance period with the panel thicknesses used for this project so the design team has been slightly modest.

Regulations in Europe have meant there are no precedents for Stadthaus. However, architectural and engineering methods in timber construction pioneered by Waugh Thistleton and Techniker are now accepted internationally. By gaining the necessary certificates from both NHBC and Building Research Establishment, both of which treated Stadthaus as a pilot scheme, the design team considers that timber panels are the building material of an environmentally conscious future.

== Awards ==
The Stadthaus was awarded the Wood Award 2008, Structural category / Judges Special Award and the RIBA President's Award for Research 2009.

== Sample buildings ==
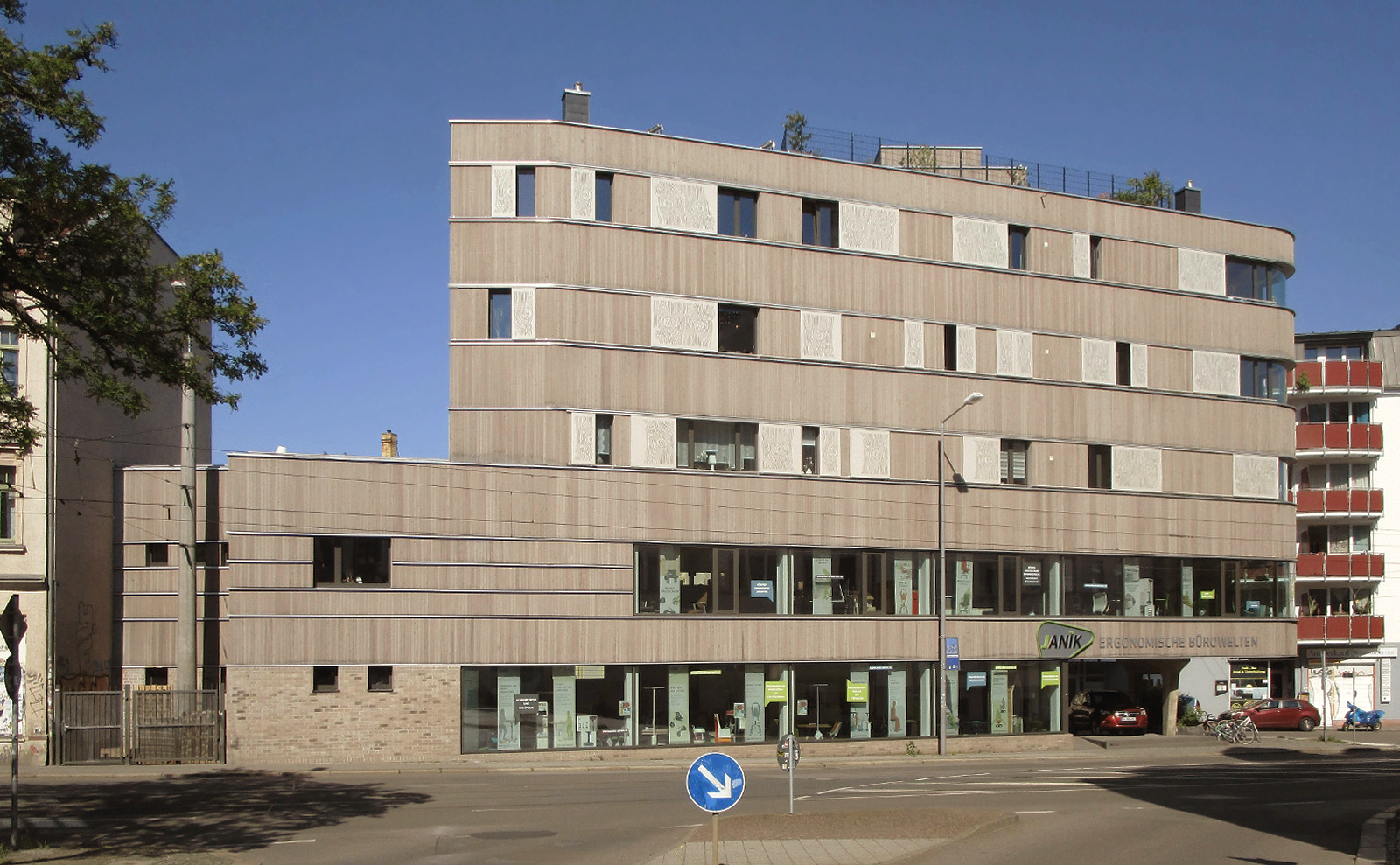
Wooden house Z8, residential and commercial building in Leipzig, Germany (2021)

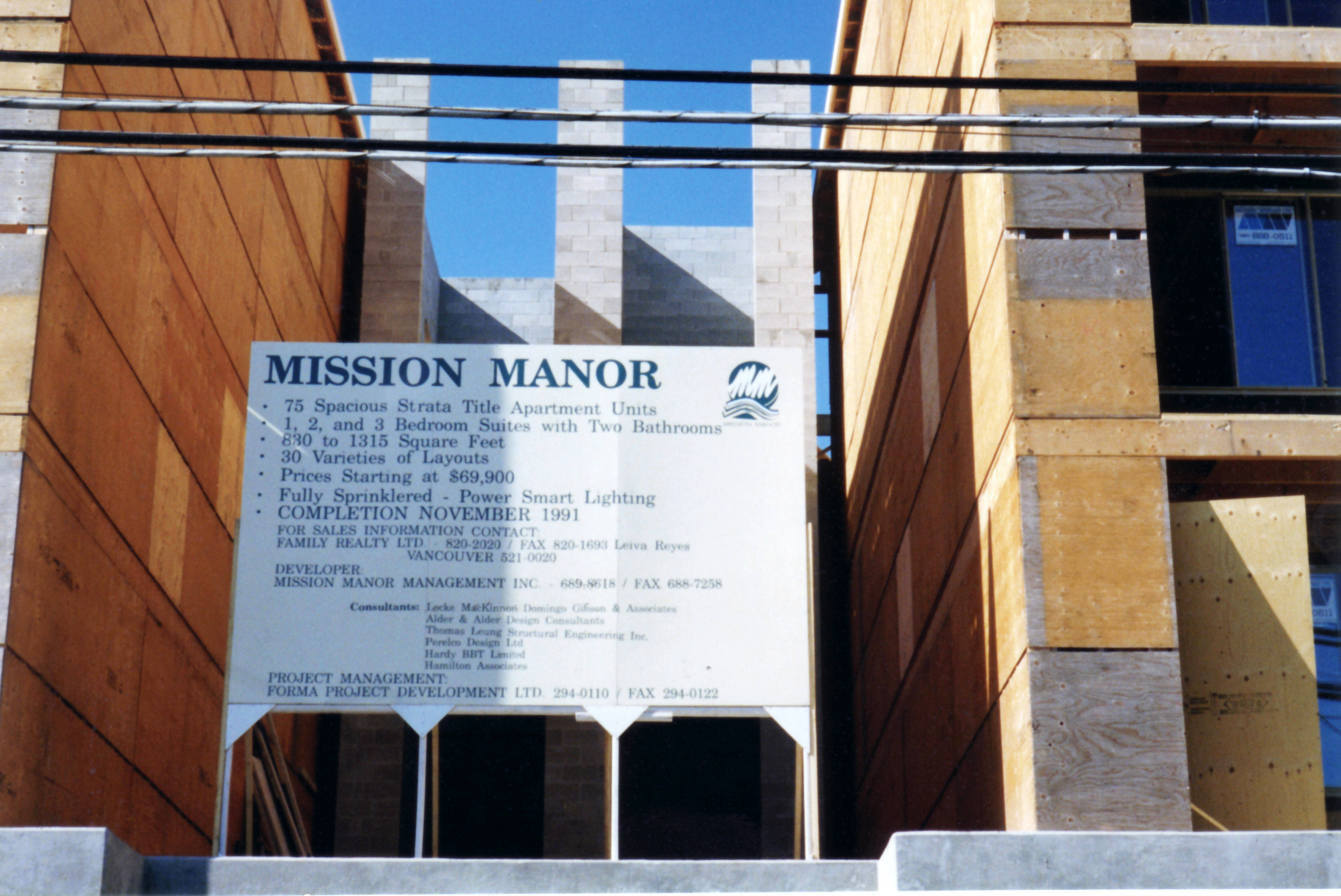
Mission Manor, Mission (British Columbia), Canada 75 flats, in construction

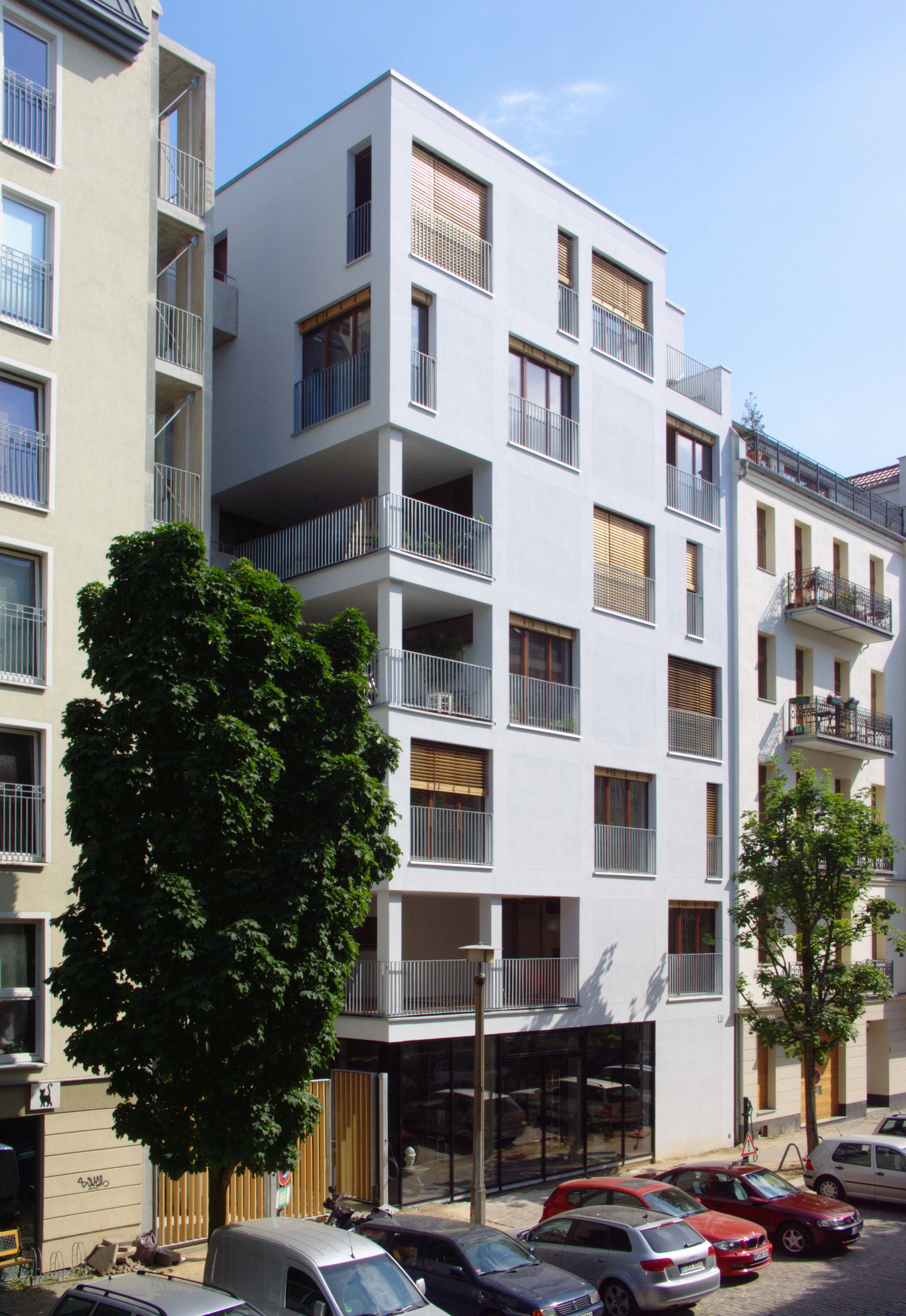
Holzhaus (wooden house) E3 in Berlin

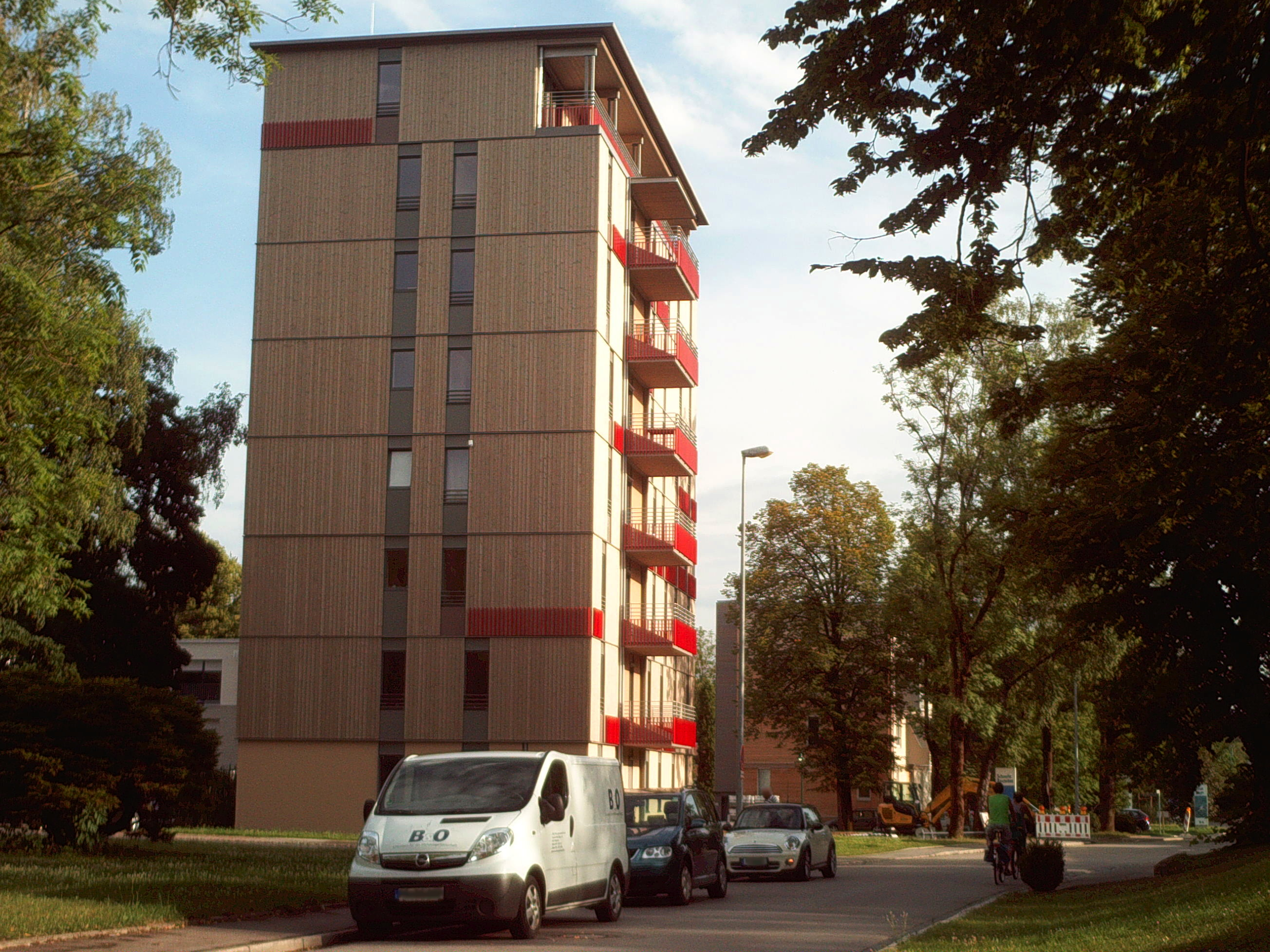
Holzhaus H8 in Bad Aibling 7 floors

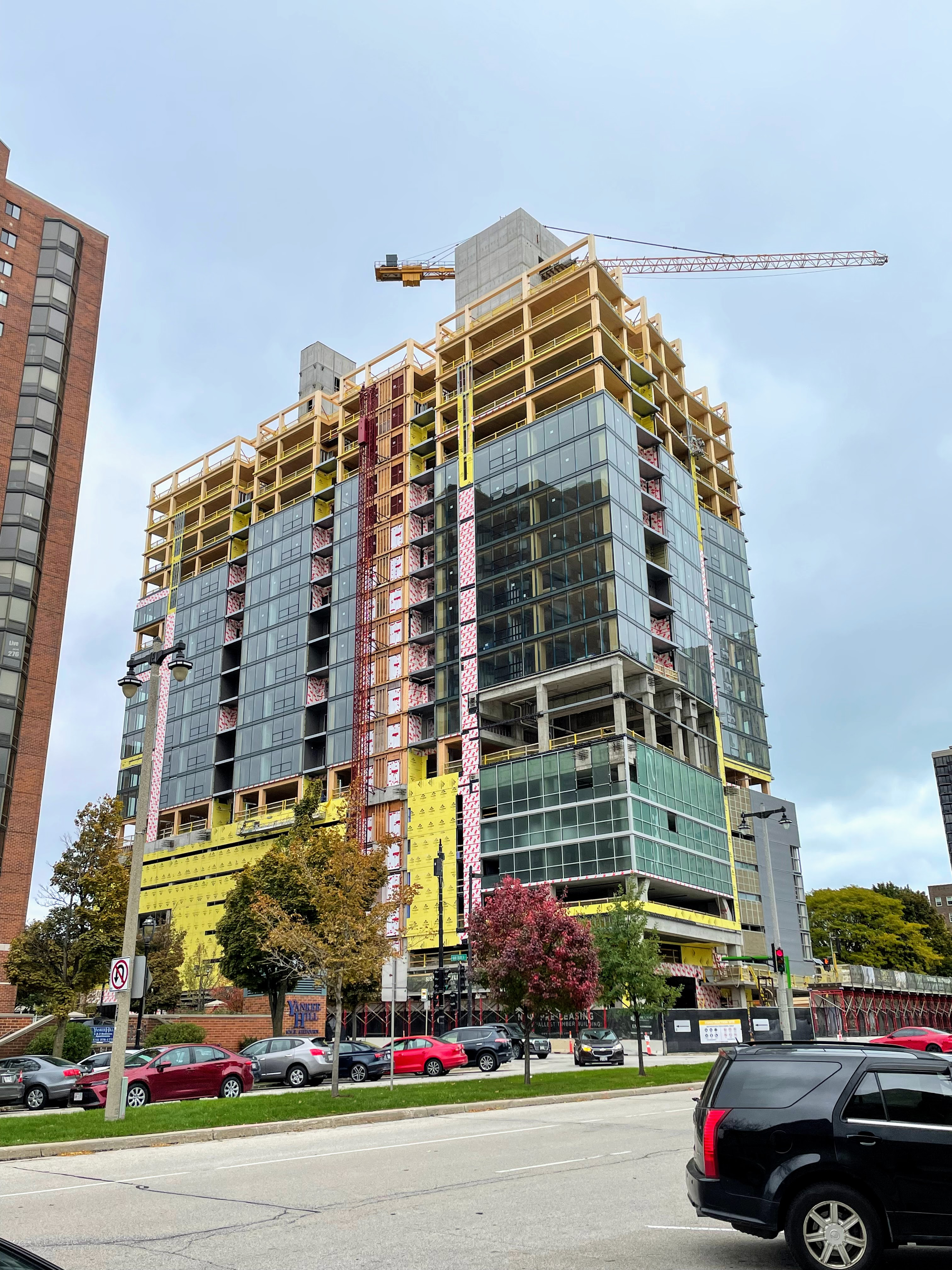
Ascent MKE, Milwaukee, Wisconsin, tallest residential high-rise made of wood since 2022, under construction

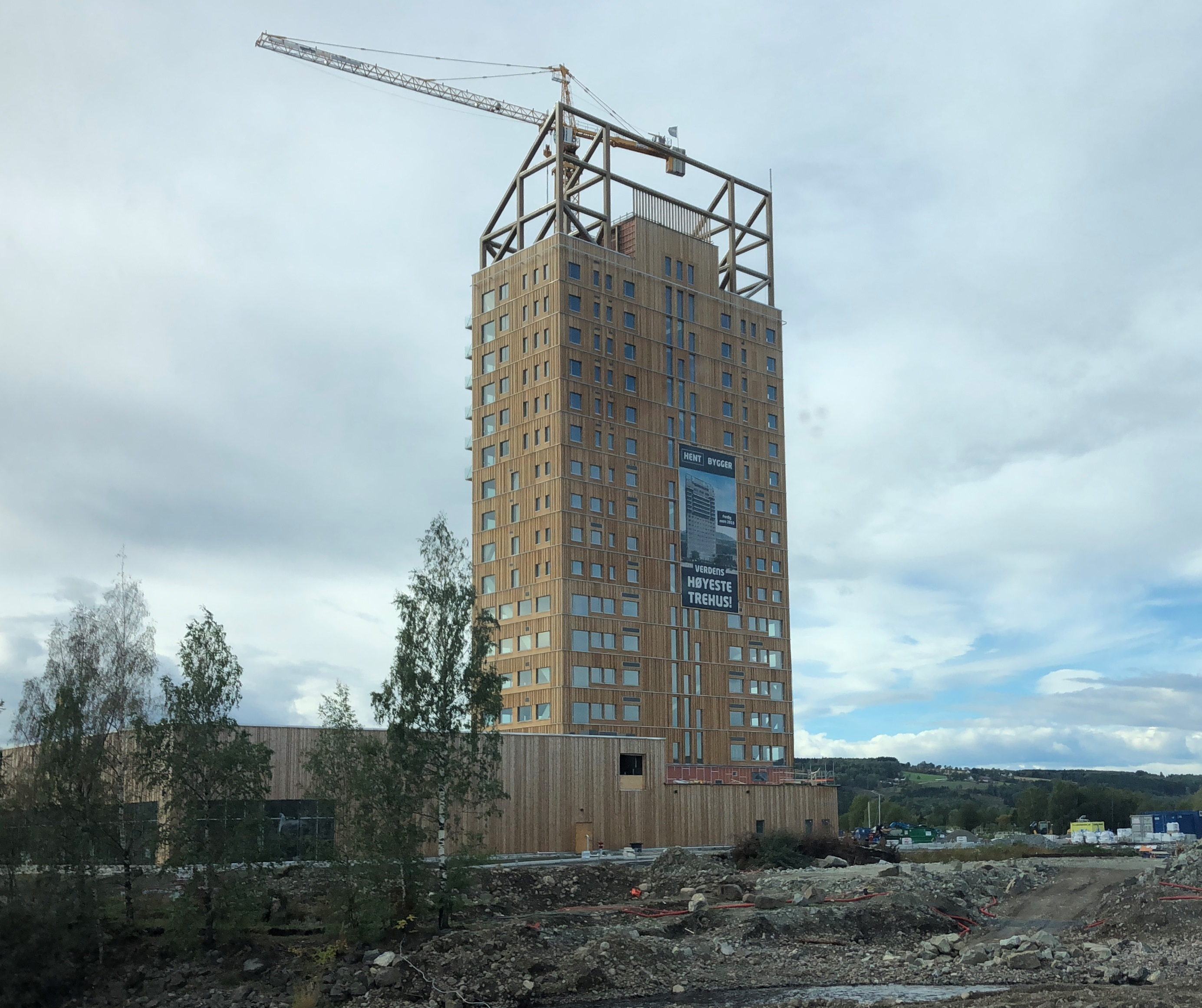
Mjøstårnet, Brumunddal, Norway, under construction in 2018

== See also ==
- Sutyagin House - 44m private residence in northern Russia demolished in 2009

== Additional References ==
- .Yates, Megan et al., "Design of an 8 storey Residential Tower from KLH Cross Laminated Solid Timber Panels", written for World Conference for Timber Engineering, Japan 2008
- European technical approval, “KLH solid wood slabs”, ETA-06/0138, issued by OIB – Österreichisches Institut für Bautechnik, Wien.
- Office of the Deputy Prime Minister, “A-3 Disproportionate Collapse”, The Building Regulations 2000, Approved Document A, pp. 39–43.
- Milner M., Chiltern Clarke Bond, “Design Guidance for Disproportionate Collapse”, UK Timber Frame Association, Number 3, March 2005.
- Krapfenbauer T. J., “Bautabellen”, Verlag Jugend & Volk GmbH, Wien, edition 2006/07.
