= Plyscraper =

Skyscraper made at least partly of wood

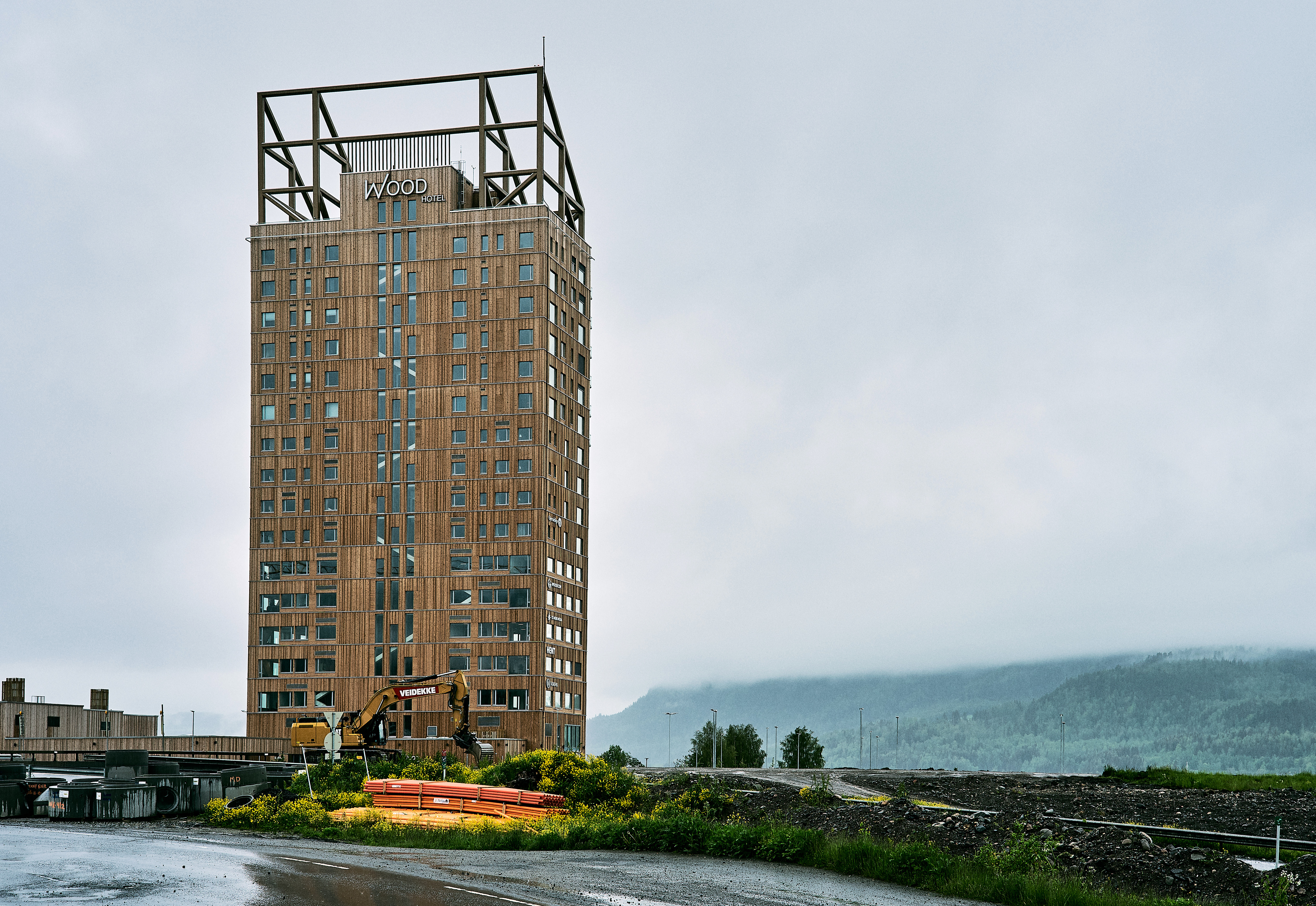
The Lake Mjøsa Skyscraper in Brumunddal, Norway, is built of cross-laminated timber (CLT).

A plyscraper, or timber tower is a skyscraper made (at least partly) of wood. They may alternatively be known as mass timber buildings.

== Materials ==
There are four main types of engineered wood used for mass timber including cross-laminated timber (CLT), glued laminated timber (glulam), laminated strand lumber (LSL), and laminated veneer lumber (LVL). Of these three wood systems, CLT is the most commonly used.

When other materials, such as concrete or steel, are used in conjunction with engineered wood, these plyscrapers are called “hybrids”. For hybrid buildings, there are some approaches to how different materials can be used including the “Cree’s System” which was developed by Cree Buildings, and the “Finding the Forest Through the Trees" (FFTT) construction model” developed by Michael Green. Cree's System combines the use of concrete and wood mainly in its hybrid flooring systems. In some instances, concrete can also be used as a core or for the foundation of a building because wood is too light. The FFTT construction model incorporates a wooden core and wooden floor slabs mixed with steel beams to provide ductility to the building.

== Advantages and disadvantages ==
When considering which engineered wood system to use for a plyscraper the individual benefits of each must be compared. CLT has a high fire resistance due to the fire-resistant adhesive used and the surface char layer that forms when it is exposed to fire. The surface char layer protects the interior of the wood from further damage. Glulam is typically used for columns and beams as an alternative to commonly used steel and concrete. This is because it has a greater tensile strength-to-weight ratio than steel and can resist compression better than concrete. LVL also has the same strength as concrete. As plyscrapers are made from wood, they sequester carbon during construction and are renewable if the forests that they are sourced from are sustainably managed.

Despite these benefits, there are bound to be some drawbacks when using the various engineered woods. Steel overall has a greater strength and durability for the same sized profile when compared to its wood counterpart. Thus, a building made with steel beams would require smaller beams than the same building constructed with wooden beams. Walls and columns in the interior spaces of these plyscrapers can get so thick that the size of said interior space gets heavily reduced. This issue however, does not occur within shorter buildings.

== Tallest plyscrapers ==
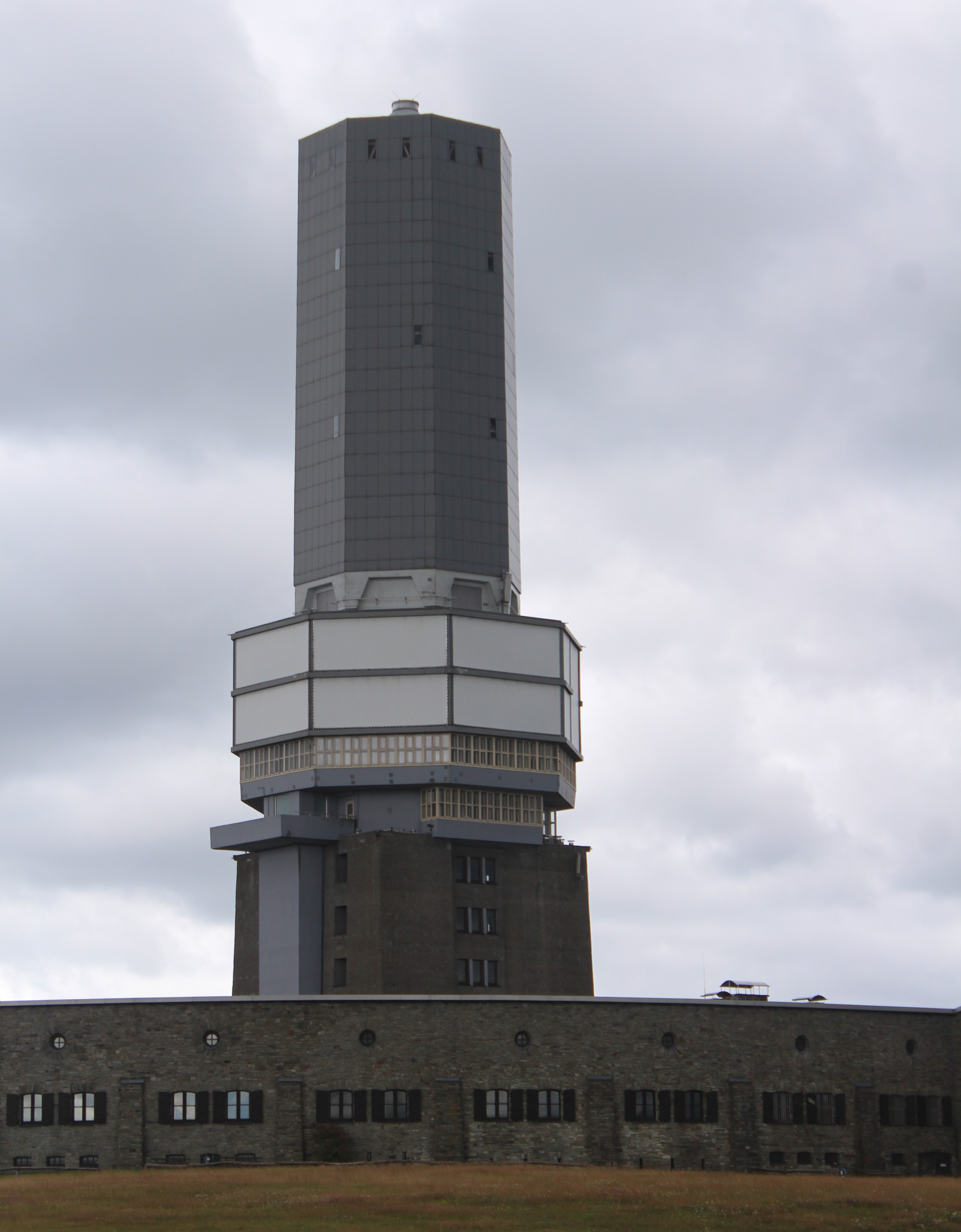
Feldberg telecommunication tower

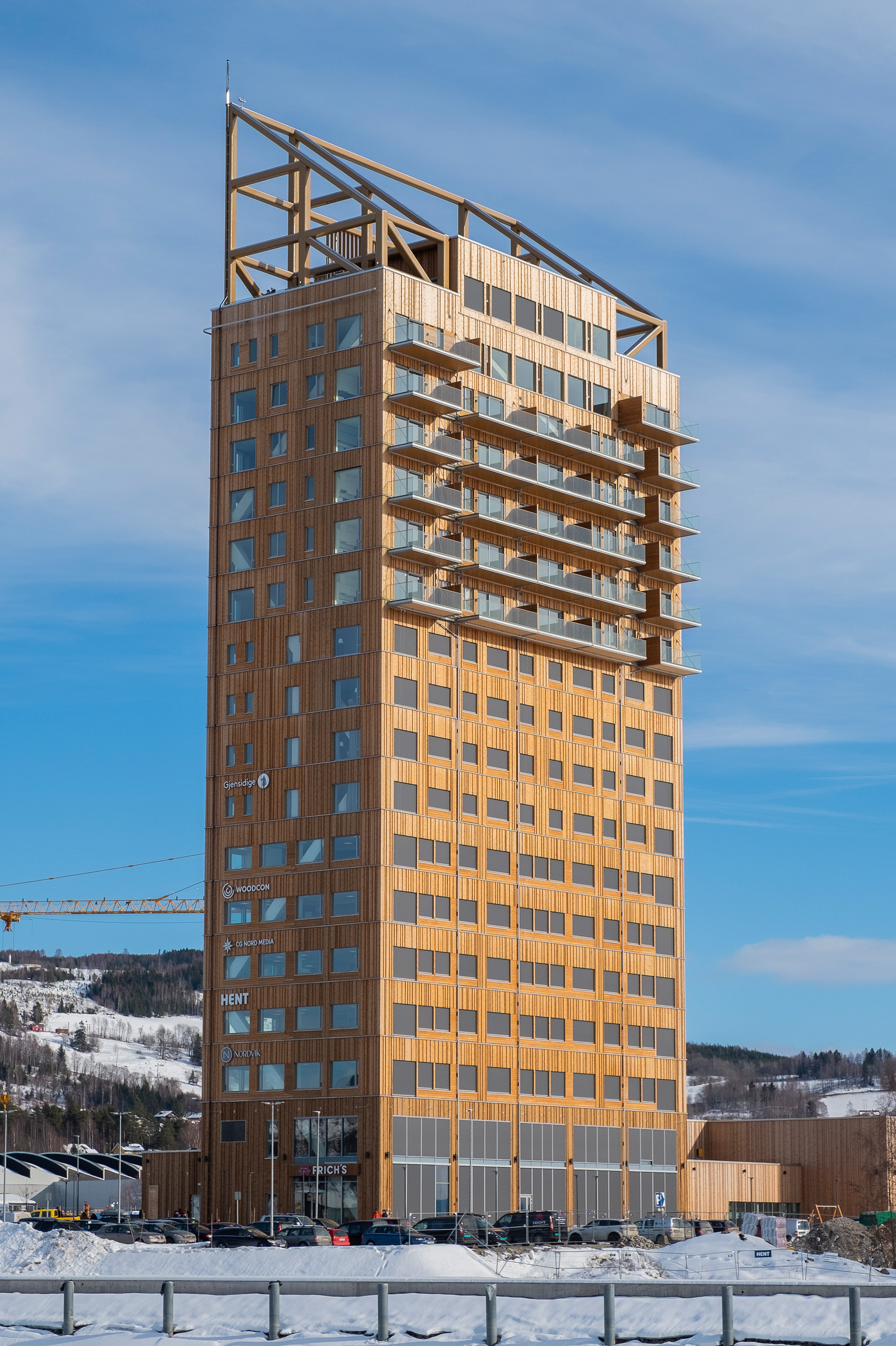
Mjøstårnet in Brumunddal, Norway

One of the first hybrid plyscrapers is the 69 metres (226 ft) tall highrise-like Feldberg telecommunication tower on Large Feldberg Mountain near Schmitten, Hesse, Germany with 19 floors, which was built in 1937 and rebuilt after war damages in its actual shape in 1950. The upper nine floors of this building are for radiotechnical reasons made of wood without metallic parts; the lowest five floors are made of concrete, followed by five floors of steel.

Over the years, many plyscrapers have been constructed, each becoming taller than the last. In 2017, the tallest habitable plyscraper was Brock Commons Tallwood House, on the campus of the University of British Columbia near Vancouver, Canada and measured 53 metres (174 ft) tall. It was overtaken in 2019, when the Mjøstårnet was built in Brumunddal, Norway. The Mjøstårnet measured 85.4 metres (280 ft). However, in 2022, the title of the tallest habitable plyscraper shifted once again when the Ascent MKE Building, located in Milwaukee, Wisconsin was built measuring 86.56 metres (284.0 ft).

== Future ==
The use of mass timber has been popular in Europe for a few years but has gain traction in the United States as knowledge of engineered woods products and their use in construction has increased. Plyscrapers remains in early stage of development, but as knowledge increases, many mass-timber buildings have been proposed. They are becoming popular among contractors and builders because of construction related advantage, as assembling a plyscraper is faster and quieter compared to steel and concrete structure.

Proposals to build more plyscrapers are in the works around the globe. In Tokyo, a 350 m (1,148 ft)-tall plyscraper called the W350 Project has been proposed with a 2041 completion target that would be a hybrid of 90% engineered wood and 10% steel. Research and planning are underway in London for the Oakwood Tower, which will reach an estimated 300 m (984 ft) into the sky, making it an 80-storey addition to the London skyline. And a design team in Chicago has proposed a concept for a building to be called the River Beech Tower that would be 228 m (748 ft) tall and deploy an "exterior diagrid system" to exploit timber's natural axial strength, allowing efficient load distribution throughout the building.

== See also ==
- List of tallest wooden buildings
- Skyscraper design and construction
- Skyline
