= Cross-laminates =

Cross-laminates are products that feature layers of material that are laid down at right angles to each other, in order to provide greater strength across a uniform surface. Cross-laminated timber (similar to plywood) is one example. There are also synthetic, flexible films with enhanced properties via mechanical manipulation of the film.
