= Metricon =

Australian home building company

- Type: Private
- Industry: Home construction
- Founded: 1976
- Founders: Mario Biasin; George Kline
- Headquarters: Notting Hill, Victoria, Australia
- Area served: Australia
- Key people: Peter Langfelder (Chief Executive)
- Products: Houses
- Number of employees: 2,500 (2022)
- Website: www.metricon.com.au

Metricon is a home construction company in Australia. The company has been the largest home builder in Australia since 2016. Metricon currently runs its operation from its headquarters in Notting Hill. Metricon also builds in New South Wales, Queensland and South Australia. As at May 2022, it had 2,500 employees.

== History ==
Metricon was founded by Mario Biasin and George Kline in Caulfield, Melbourne in 1976 to build homes, develop land, sell house and land packages and construct commercial buildings.

In September 2024, Sumitomo Forestry Group announced it would acquire a 51 per cent stake in Metricon for A$115 million.

== Sponsorships ==
From 2011 until 2022, Metricon was the naming rights of Carrara Stadium on the Gold Coast, the home stadium of the Gold Coast Suns. From 2018 until 2022, Metricon was shirt sponsor of the Melbourne Victory. In 2019, Metricon became naming rights sponsor of the South Sydney Rabbitohs high performance centre at Redfern Oval.
