= Cross-laminated timber =

Wood panel product made from solid-sawn lumber

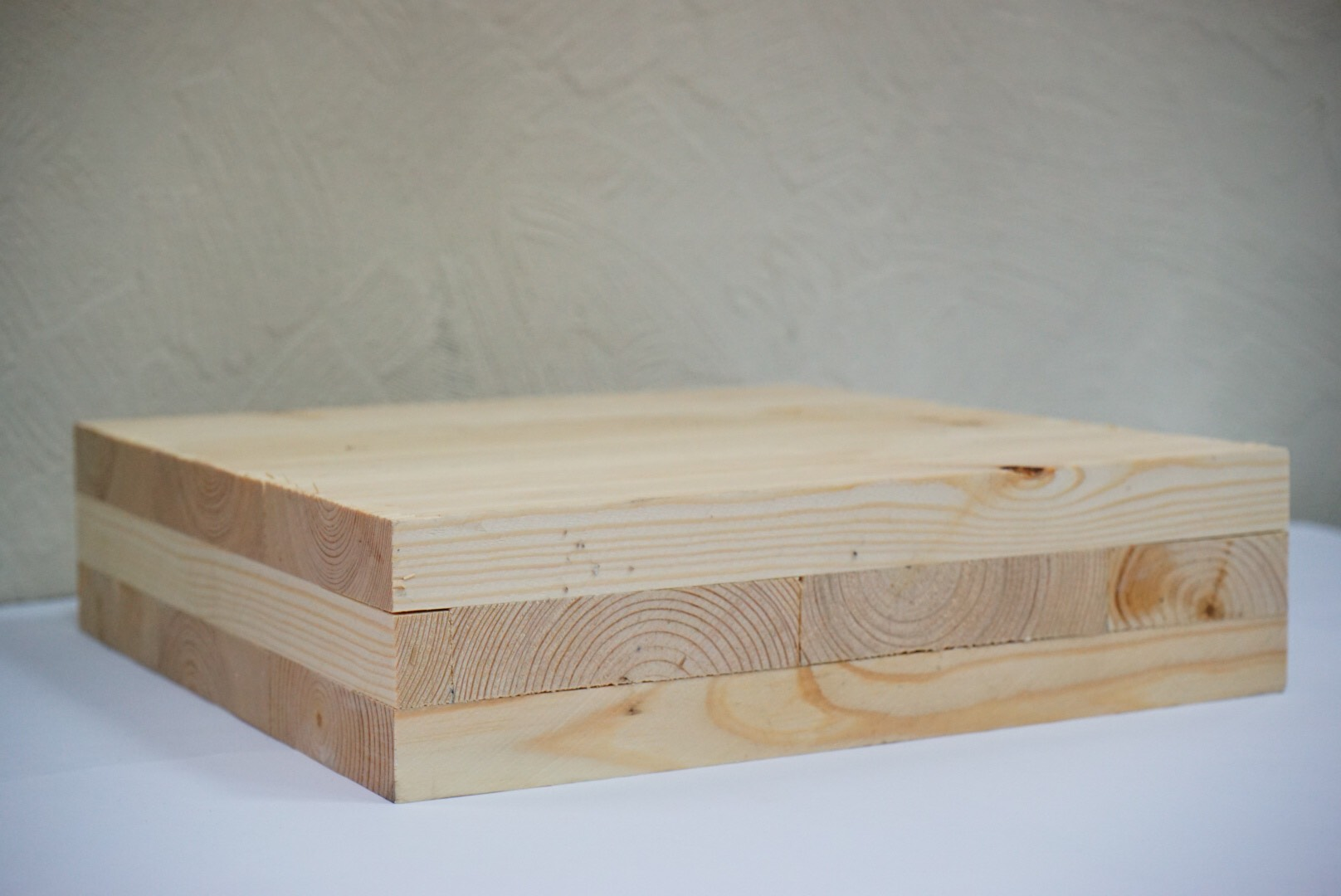
CLT-plate with three layers made from spruce

Cross-laminated timber (CLT) is a subcategory of engineered wood panel product made from gluing together at least three layers of solid-sawn lumber at angles to each other. It is similar to plywood but with distinctively thicker laminations (or lamellae). CLT was first used in a building in the 90s. Circular-CLT (C-CLT) was first used in a building, The Urban Woods in the Netherlands, in 2024.

The grain of each layer of boards is usually rotated 90 degrees from that of adjacent layers and glued on the wide faces of each board, usually in a symmetric way so that the outer layers have the same orientation. An odd number of layers is most common, but there are configurations with even numbers as well (which are then arranged to give a symmetric configuration). Regular timber is an anisotropic material, meaning that the physical properties change depending on the direction at which the force is applied. By gluing layers of wood at right angles, the panel is able to achieve better structural rigidity in both directions.

CLT is distinct from glued laminated timber (known as glulam), which is a product with all laminations orientated in the same way.

== History ==
=== CLT ===
The first patent resembling CLT was first developed in the 1920s by Frank J. Walsh and Robert L. Watts in Tacoma, Washington. Many sources however, date the first patent back to 1985 when it was patented in France. Significant developments were then made in Austria when Gerhard Schickhofer presented his PhD thesis research on CLT in 1994. Utilizing the theories he developed during his research, Schickhofer began working with three small sawmills and the Sawmillers Association, to start production of CLT. With help from some government funding, they were able to hand build a test CLT press and create the first few panels. At the same time, the first press system, utilizing water-based pressure, came on the market enabling Schickhofer and his team to think beyond the capabilities originally thought possible for CLT. After years of extensive research, Schickofer submitted the results to the Austrian and EU government bodies that dealt with the approval of materials for commercial products and in December 1998 it was approved. A period of substantial growth in production and projects soon followed in Germany and other European countries as a push for green buildings became more prominent. CLT was slow to take off in North America, but it has begun to gain momentum in more recent years.

=== C-CLT ===
In 2024 C-CLT was introduced to the world as a result of a chainwide collaboration in The Netherlands. C-CLT, or Circular-CLT, is CLT made out of non-virgin wood. The Circular Cross-Laminated Timber panels, C-CLT, are made from demolition wood and discarded pallets, all sourced locally in The Netherlands. The outer layer is made of ash wood. The thick solid wooden panels that are created comply with European regulations, reduce CO₂ emissions and are of course circular; it is even 'up-cycling': low-quality wood becomes a high-quality building product. The plates are 10 to 15% stronger than traditional CLT. C-CLT was first used in june in a modern highrise building called The Urban Woods. C-CLT is the result of a comprehensive Dutch collaboration. The pallets are prepared by the local social enterprise. Then planks are made, connected with finger joints, and cross laminated into solid panels. The Urban Climate Architects delivered the design, and The Urban Woods treats the wood and builds modern modular homes from it. Researchers of the TNO institute conduct thorough research including metal parts detection, adhesive bonding, and strength classification.

== Building codes ==
In 2002, Austria used Schickhofer's research to create the first national CLT guidelines. The International European Technical Assessments (ETA) began to regulate the properties and design of CLT in 2006. Efforts to standardize CLT in Europe started in 2008 and by 2015 the first European product standard for CLT, EN 16351, was approved. Also in 2015, CLT was incorporated into the International Building Code in accordance with ANSI/APA PRG 320 and the National Fire Protection Association (NFPA) began to research and develop codes regarding the fire safety of CLT and other engineered woods. The 2021 revision of the IBC included three new construction types for mass timber buildings, Type IV-A, Type IV-B and Type IV-C. These new types enabled buildings using mass timber to be built taller and over greater areas than before.

== Manufacturing ==
The manufacturing of CLT is generally divided into nine steps: primary lumber selection, lumber grouping, lumber planing, lumber cutting, adhesive application, panel lay-up, assembly pressing, quality control and marking and shipping.

During primary lumber selection, lumber will undergo a moisture content (MC) check and visual grading. Depending on the application, structural testing (E-rating) may also be completed. The moisture content check is conducted because the lumber that is typically used, can arrive with a MC of 19% or less, but lumber for CLT needs to have a MC of approximately 12% during manufacturing to avoid internal stress due to shrinkage. This test is also done so that adjacent pieces of lumber do not have an MC difference greater than 5%. In order to conduct an MC check, various hand-held or on the line devices can be used. Some are more accurate than others, as they check moisture content within the wood not just at surface level. Further research and development is ongoing to improve the accuracy of such devices. Temperature in the manufacturing facility is also checked and maintained throughout this process to ensure the quality of the lumber. Visual grading is performed so that any warping in the lumber is prevented from affecting the pressure the bond line can withstand. It also ensures that waning, defects in the wood due to bark or missing wood due to the curvature of the log, does not significantly reduce the available bonding surface. For a product to be considered an E-class CLT, visual grading must be considered for perpendicular layers while parallel layers must be determined by the E-rating (the average stiffness of a piece of lumber). Products are classified as V-class if visual grading is used for both perpendicular and parallel layers.

Using the results from lumber selection, the grouping step ensures the timber of various categories are grouped together. Lumber used for the major and minor strength directions are grouped primarily relying on MC and visual grading. Within the major strength direction, all lumber is required to have the same engineering properties so that panel limitations can be determined. Likewise, all lumber for the minor direction must have a single set of properties. Higher quality lumber can also be grouped so that it is reserved for areas in which fasteners are installed to maximize fastener effectiveness. For aesthetic purposes, some lumber will be set aside so that the outermost layer of a panel is visually appealing. Timber that does not fit into either category may be used for different products, such as plywood or glued laminated timber.

The planing step improves the surfaces of the timber to reduce oxidation which increases the effectiveness of the adhesives. Approximately 2.5 mm is trimmed off the top and bottom faces and 3.8 mm is trimmed off the sides to ensure a flat surface. In some cases, when the lumber edges are not glued because they have an acceptable width tolerance, only the top and bottom faces are planed. It is possible that planing may increase the overall moisture content of the timber due to the drying variations throughout the wood. When this occurs, bonding suitability should be assessed and reconditioning may be necessary.

The timber is then cut to a certain length depending on the application and specific client needs. Cut-offs from the longitudinal layers may be used to create the transverse layers if the same specifications are needed for both the parallel and perpendicular layers.

Application of the adhesive occurs shortly after planing to avoid any issues affecting the surface of the lumber. Applying the adhesive is most often done in one of two ways: a through-feed process or side-by-side nozzles. In the through-feed process extruder heads distribute parallel threads of adhesive along the piece of lumber in an airtight system to avoid air gaps in the glue that could affect bonding strength. This is typically used for phenol resorcinol formaldehyde (PRF) or polyurethane-reactive (PUR) adhesives. For PUR adhesives, the layers of lumber may be misted to help with curing. The side-by-side nozzle option is commonly reserved for CLT layers that are formed in advance and works by installing the nozzles along a beam that will travel along the length of the lumber and apply the adhesive. To avoid additional manufacturing costs, adhesive is typically only applied to the top and bottom faces of the lumber, but edge-gluing can be done if necessary.

Panel lay-up is performed next and involves laying the individual pieces of lumber together in preparation for assembly pressing. In accordance with ANSI/APA PRG 320, at least 80% of the surface area between layers must be bound together so that the bond is effective. In order to meet this standard, manufacturers are tasked with finding the most efficient way of laying the lumber. This time between spreading the adhesive and applying pressure is known as assembly time and must fall within the time targeted by the specific adhesive used.

Assembly pressing completes the adhering process with either a vacuum press or a hydraulic press. Vacuum pressing generates a pressure of approximately 14.5 pounds per square inch (0.100 MPa), which is not always enough to address the warping potential or surface irregularities. To accommodate this, lumber shrinkage reliefs can be cut in the longitudinal direction. These reliefs release the stress in the lumber and decrease the risk of cracking due to drying. They must however, have a maximum width and depth so that the bonding area and panel strength are not impacted significantly. Using a vacuum press may be more beneficial in some circumstances, because they can press more than one CLT panel at once and can be used for curved elements. A hydraulic press on the other hand, generates a greater pressure, ranging from 40 to 80 pounds per square inch (280–550 kPa), and applies it to specific faces of the panel. For this reason, panels may need to undergo both vertical and side clamping pressing.

Once assembly pressing is complete, the CLT panels undergo quality control machining. Sanders are used to sand each panel down to the desired thickness with a tolerance of 1 mm, or less if specified by a project. The CLT panels are then moved to a multi-axis numerically controlled machine that makes precision cuts for doors, windows, splices, and connections. Any minor repairs that are necessary at this stage are completed manually.

To meet the requirements of ANSI/APA PRG 320 and ensure that the correct product has been specified, delivered, and installed, CLT panels must be marked to identify a variety of information. This includes the grade, thickness, mill name, agency name or logo, ANSI/APA PRG 320 symbol, manufacturer designations, and a top stamp if it is a custom panel. These markings must be stamped at intervals of 8 feet (2.4 m) or less so that when longer pieces are delivered to site and cut, they still display the necessary information. Further markings may be added to demonstrate the main direction of loading and the zones designed to receive connections. During shipping and construction, the CLT panels must be protected from the weather to maintain their structural integrity.

== Advantages ==
As a building material, CLT has numerous advantages:

Design flexibility
CLT has many applications in construction as it can be used for walls, floors, and roofs. The size of the panels is also easily varied as it is only limited by the site storage and transportation to the site.
Environmentally conscious
CLT is a renewable, green, and sustainable material, if the trees used to make it are sourced from efficiently managed forests.
Carbon capture
Because CLT is made from wood, it sequesters carbon. Different factors will affect how much carbon is sequestered, but numerous studies have shown that the use of CLT (in combination with other engineered wood) in construction could significantly reduce our net carbon emission output.
Prefabrication
CLT panels are fully fabricated before they are transported to site. This enables quicker construction times compared to other materials which can lead to shorter schedules and its subsequent benefits such as cost savings, less risk for accidents, and reduced disruption to the neighborhood.
Thermal insulation
CLT panels provide air tightness and great thermal insulation to buildings as the thermal conductivity of a panel is approximately 0.1016 W/m⋅K. Other common building materials can have thermal conductivity ranging from 0.4 to 2.5 W/m⋅K. The various layers of wood also serve as a thermal mass, which can help reduce a building's energy use.
Light weight
CLT is significantly lighter than traditional building materials so foundations can be designed to support a smaller load and therefore use less material. The machinery required on-site to move and place the CLT panels are also smaller than those needed to lift heavier building materials. These aspects enable contractors to erect CLT buildings on sites that might otherwise be incapable of supporting heavier projects. This can help ease infilling projects where construction is especially tight or difficult to access due to other preexisting structures around the site.
Strength and stiffness
CLT products have relatively high in and out of plane strength and stiffness due to the perpendicular layers. This reinforcement is comparable to a reinforced concrete slab and increases the panel's resistance to splitting. CLT has also been shown to perform well under seismic forces.
Fire safety
Wood is inherently flammable which leads to the D class fire rating CLT receives. Despite this, CLT ranks highly for its ability to withstand a fire once started. It is classified as REI 90, indicating that it can retain the necessary load bearing capacity and meet integrity requirements for 90 minutes during a fire. This leads to a better overall fire safety performance than unprotected steel, which loses its load bearing capacity after it is exposed to a fire for only 15 minutes.

== Disadvantages ==
There are also some drawbacks associated with CLT:

Costs
As CLT is a newer material for North America, it is only produced in a few regions, generally the Pacific Northwest. Transporting CLT panels across potentially vast distances will incur additional upfront costs. Some sources also indicate that the production costs of CLT are greater than other commonly used building materials due to the newness of the system and lack of current demand.
Limited track record
CLT is a new venture for many in North America which can limit the number of engineers and contractors willing to take on a CLT project due to their lack of knowledge and experience with the material. The building codes for mass timber projects are also not as developed as those for concrete and steel which can again make developers hesitant to employ CLT. A considerable amount of technical research has been done on CLT, but it takes time to integrate new practices and results into the building industry because of its path-dependent culture which resists deviating from established practices, especially when the research conducted on CLT has not necessarily reached those who have the opportunity to implement it.
Acoustics
CLT alone does not meet the necessary sound insulation ratings. In order to meet these requirements, additional elements, such as decoupled gypsum board, must be used in conjunction with the CLT panels. Changing the effective mass area of the CLT panel by increasing thickness or adding a second panel (creating an air gap) also improved the sound insulation to meet the standards.
Vibrations
Current standardized methods for testing the vibration performance of floors are not applicable to CLT floors due to their lightweight nature and natural frequency. Looking at deflection under a uniformly distributed load, we can get some idea of the vibration performance of a CLT floor, but it is heavily reliant on a designer's judgement and neglects the influence of mass characteristics. In order to fully test the vibration performance of a CLT floor, a new testing method will need to be developed.

== Applications ==
CLT is used in a number of various different structures around the world.

=== Pavilions ===
In September 2016 the world's first timber mega-tube structure was built at the Chelsea College of Arts in London, using hardwood CLT panels. The 35-metre-long (115 ft) "Smile" was designed by architect Alison Brooks and engineered by Arup, in collaboration with the American Hardwood Export Council, for the London Design Festival. The structure is a curved tube in a shape of a smile touching the floor at its centre and has a maximum capacity of 60 people.

=== Plyscrapers ===
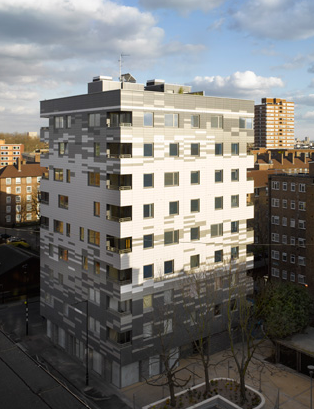
Stadthaus in Hackney, London

Stadthaus, a residential building in Hackney, London, built in 2009, was the first building constructed using only CLT framing, including for the stairs and elevator shaft. At 9 stories and 30 metres (98 ft) tall, at the time of construction, it was the tallest CLT building in the world.

In 2012, Forte Living, an apartment complex in Melbourne, Australia, became the tallest plyscraper framed with CLT alone. The building has 10 stories and stands just over 32 metres (105 ft) tall. The 759 CLT panels necessary for the project were manufactured in Austria using European spruce that was grown and harvested there.

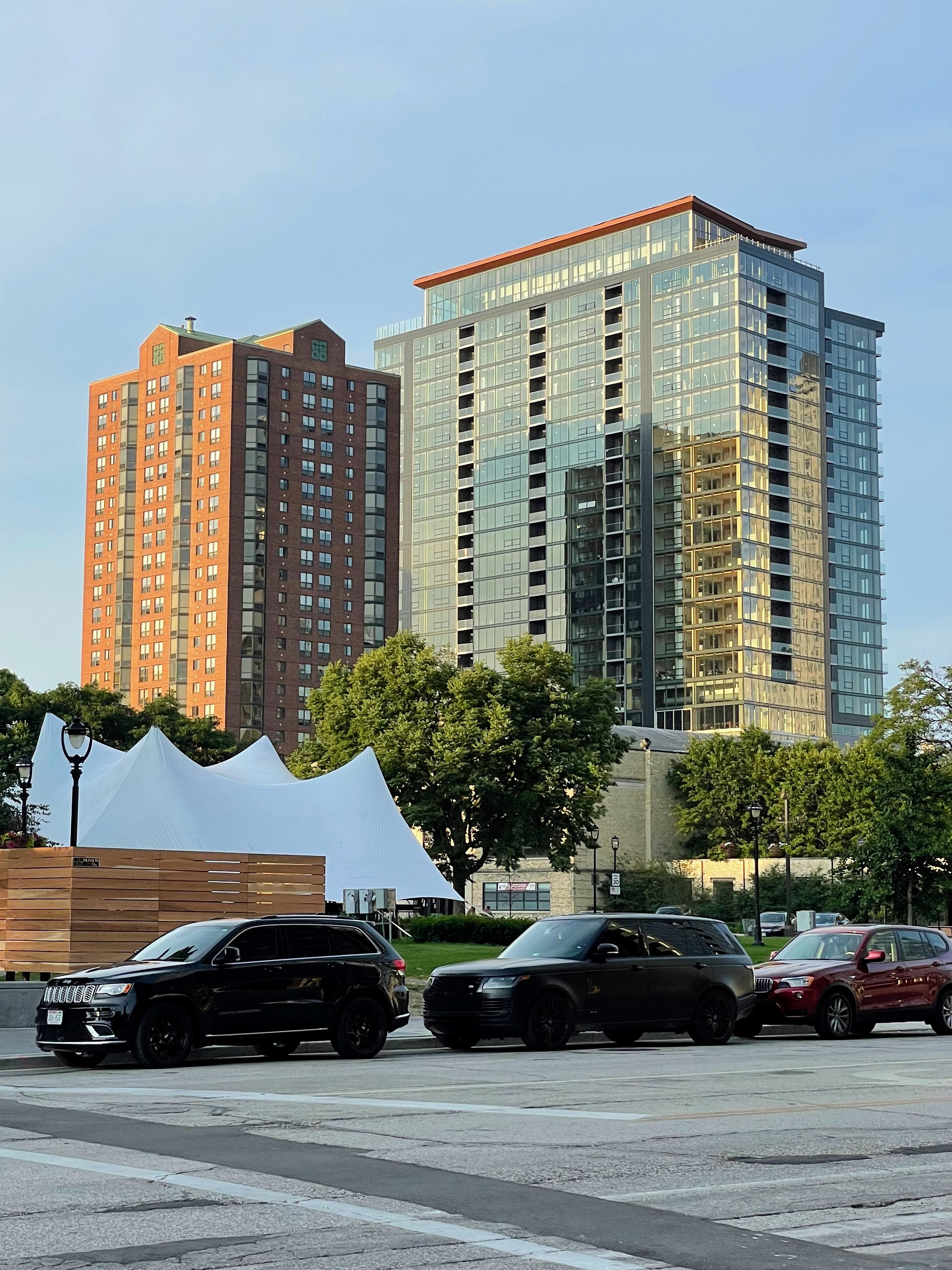
Ascent MKE in Milwaukee, Wisconsin

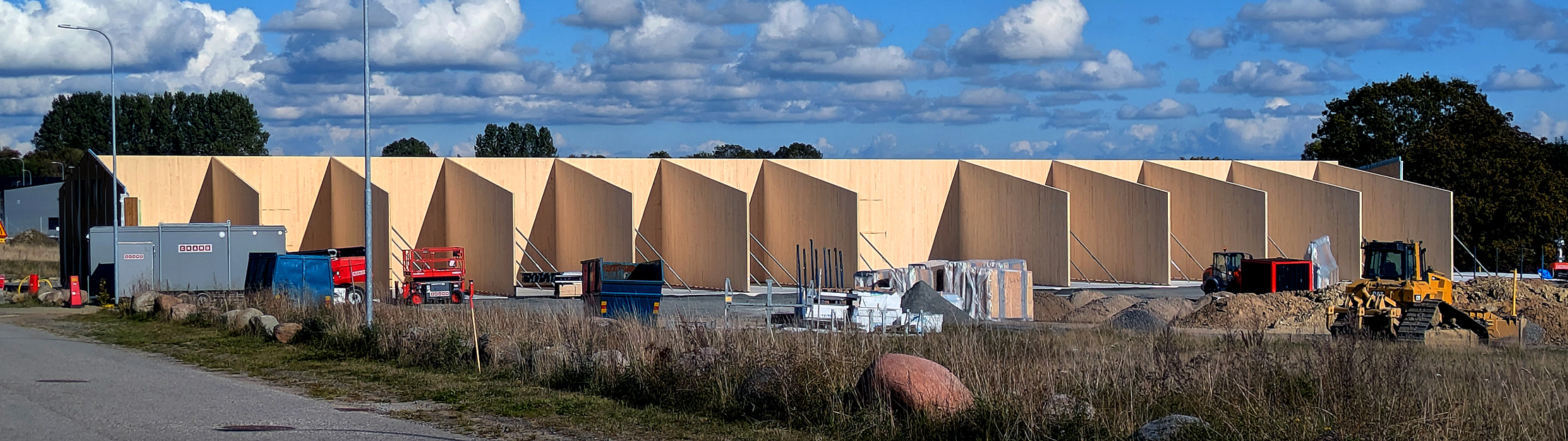
Newly built industrial premises in Ystad in 2025.

In 2022, the Ascent MKE building in Milwaukee, Wisconsin, became the tallest high-rise to utilize CLT components. Reaching 25 stories and 86.6 metres (284 ft), the Ascent relies on concrete, steel, and mass timber components. The CLT was primarily used to create the slabs for each floor.

=== Bridges ===
The Mistissini Bridge in Mistissini, Quebec, Canada, is a 160-metre-long (520 ft) bridge that crosses the Uupaachikus Pass. Designed by Stantec and completed in 2014, the Mistissini Bridge employs the use of locally sourced CLT panels and glue-laminated timber girders to serve as the main structural members of the bridge. The bridge won numerous awards including the National Award of Excellence in the Transportation category at the 48th annual Association of Consulting Engineering Companies (ACEC) and also the Engineering a Better Canada Award.

The Exploded View is a fully CLT bridge in the design phase as of December 2022. Originally proposed in 2020 by Paul Cocksedge, this bridge will cross the Liesbeek River in Cape Town, South Africa. Cocksedge plans to manufacture the CLT from eucalyptus trees, an invasive species in the area.

=== Parking structures ===
The Glenwood is a CLT parking garage that is part of a larger redevelopment plan in Springfield, Oregon. Construction is underway as of December 2022, but once complete, it will stand at four stories and have 360 parking spots. In order to help protect the CLT from the rain while keeping it exposed, a façade made from overlapping glass panels will be installed.

Open Platform and JAJA Architects won a design competition in 2020 for their plans to create a Park n' Play garage in Aarhus, Denmark. The garage not only employs the use of CLT for the structure but surrounds the garage with planters and other greenery to promote the use of the space as more than just a place to leave a car. There are six stories with 700 spots, some designed specifically to promote green transportation, including charging stations and carpool only spots. The facility was designed to help the country achieve its goal of reaching carbon neutrality by 2050.

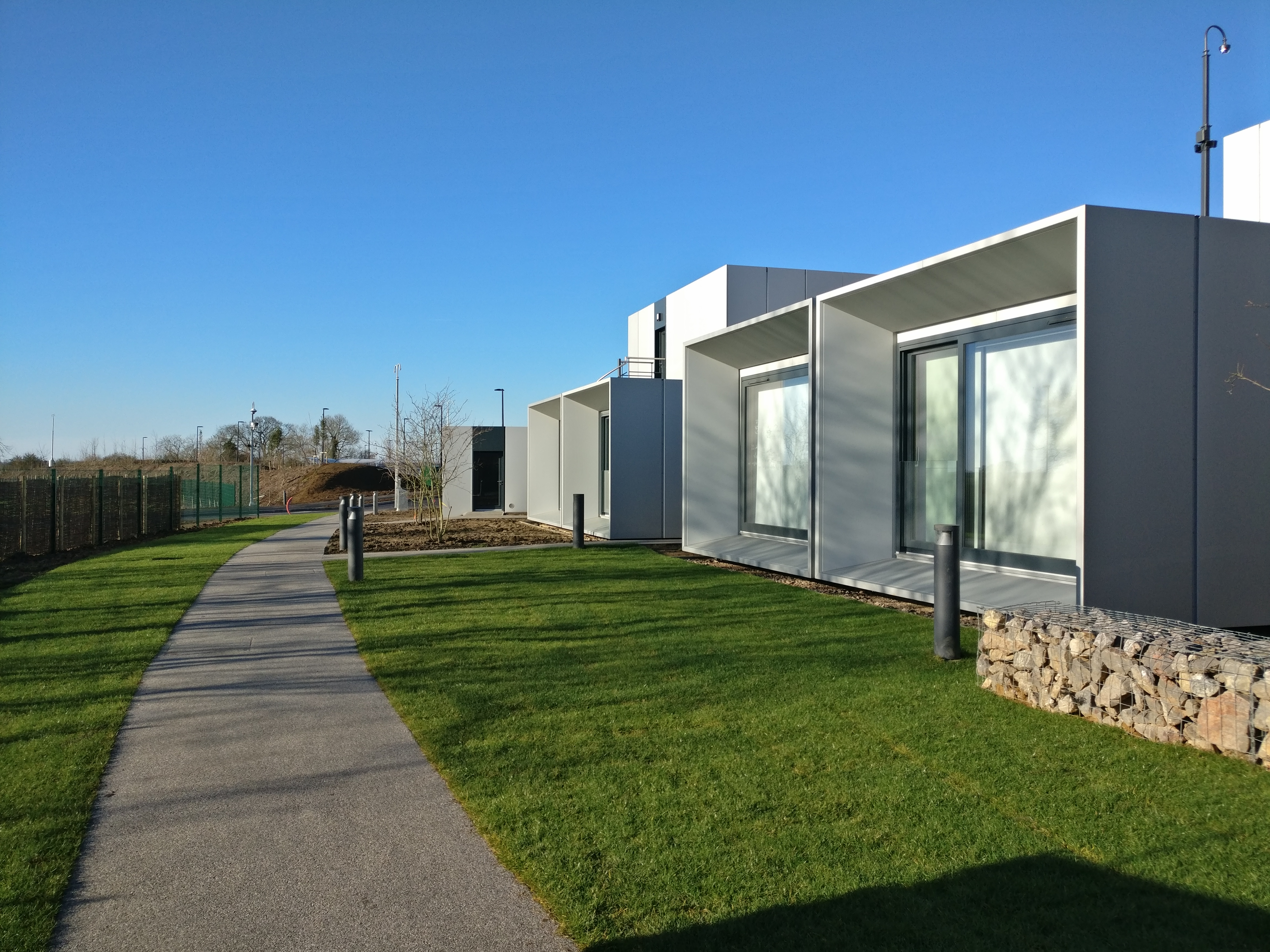
Dyson Institute Village, on-campus housing for students at Dyson Institute of Engineering and Technology in Malmesbury, England.

=== Modular construction ===
CLT has also been identified as a suitable candidate for use in modular construction. Silicon Valley–based modular construction startup Katerra opened a 23,000-square-metre (250,000 ft^{2}) modular construction CLT factory in Spokane, Washington, in 2019 and some politicians were calling for the use of pre-fabricated modular CLT construction to address the housing crisis in cities like Seattle.

The Dyson Institute Village was built in 2019 on the outskirts of Malmesbury, England, to provide on-campus student housing for the Dyson Institute of Engineering and Technology. The village was designed as a number of stacked studio apartment modules by London architects WilkinsonEyre, and modeled after Montreal's Habitat 67. The pods are constructed from CLT, with each pod wrapped in aluminum.

== Mechanical properties and effects ==
As a novel and renewable construction material, the demand of applying cross-laminated timber (CLT) has increased significantly. However, the mechanical properties of CLT have not been fully explored. This section primarily discusses research on the compressive strength and seismic behavior of CLT. In the compressive strength section, the impact of the number of CLT layers and the geometry of openings on a CLT panel is analyzed. Meanwhile, the seismic behavior of CLT is evaluated through a shaking table test that assesses the seismic shear capacity of the material.

The mechanical properties summary is based on the research of Pina et al. and Sato et al.

=== Summary of properties ===
Cross-laminated timber (CLT) is an engineered wood product that is gaining popularity in the construction industry due to its numerous advantages, such as sustainability, cost-effectiveness, and ease of construction. Mechanical properties, particularly compressive strength, are key factors to consider when designing and constructing CLT panels. The number of layers in a CLT panel has a direct impact on its compressive strength, with more layers generally resulting in higher strength. However, in the case of keeping the certain thickness of a CLT panel, more layers will result in a lower buckling capacity. Additionally, the geometry of openings in a CLT panel can also affect its compressive strength, with larger openings leading to lower strength. Also, rectangular openings oriented perpendicular to the loading direction exhibit lower sensitivity to capacity reduction when subjected to critical loading changes compared to those with an orientation parallel to the loading direction. To achieve optimal mechanical properties, it is important to carefully consider both the number of layers and the geometry of openings when designing and constructing CLT panels.

The seismic behavior of cross-laminated timber (CLT) is an area of active research and development. Studies have shown that CLT has good seismic performance due to its high stiffness and strength, as well as its ductility and energy dissipation capacity.

=== Discussions ===
==== Why CLT is sustainable ====
Cross-laminated timber (CLT) is considered sustainable because it is made from renewable wood that can be harvested responsibly. CLT production is also eco-friendly, generating fewer greenhouse gas emissions and using less energy than traditional materials like concrete and steel. CLT can help reduce a building's carbon footprint, as it absorbs and stores carbon dioxide. Its lightweight, prefabricated design minimizes waste and improves construction efficiency. Finally, CLT is durable and long-lasting, with a projected lifespan of over 100 years, making it a promising option for sustainable construction.

==== Objective and approaches of the researches ====
- For the compressive strength research, the author uses a computational homogenization procedure that is implemented numerically within a finite element framework using the commercial software ANSYS 15.0. The study aims to determine the buckling strength of Cross-Laminated Timber (CLT) walls by varying the thickness of individual layers while maintaining the total thickness. ANSYS is used to apply critical buckling loads to a set thickness wall and alter the thickness of each layer. The research demonstrates that the buckling resistance strength of CLT walls is influenced by two physical properties: the total thickness of the wall and the number of layers. Additionally, the study investigates the effect of wall openings on the wall's strength by analyzing the opening geometry, loading orientation, and opening position.
- For the seismic resistance strength research, shaking table tests were conducted for target structure, which was composed of narrow shear walls and high ductile tensile bolts. The structure was shown to behave well during severe strong motion as specified in the Japanese building standard law and to have survived the 1995 Kobe earthquake despite the occurrence of a compressive rupture in shear walls which are support elements against the vertical load. Story shear capacity calculated from a numerical model and element tests (such as connections) were safely evaluated.

==== Assumptions of the research ====
- Linear elastic constitutive law is assumed to reduce the computational time.
- The wood is assumed to be in a dry condition.
- The interface between different layers is fully bonded with no slide.
- Simply supported boundary conditions are used in all the models.
- Only rectangular cut-outs for openings are considered.
- 20mm cubic SOLID186 meshing elements was conducted by using ANSYS.

==== For further research ====
While linear elastic behavior is often assumed for Cross-Laminated Timber (CLT), in reality, its performance is not always linear and needs to be studied in a non-linear context. Additionally, the connection between different layers cannot always be fully bonded, and the moisture content of the wood will change over time. Furthermore, the impact of different opening shapes on CLT strength requires further investigation, and boundary conditions are not always simply supported. It is important to consider these factors when studying the behavior and performance of CLT in real-world applications.

== See also ==
- Engineered Wood
- Brettstapel
- Glued laminated timber
- Laminated veneer lumber
- Oriented strand board
- Green building
- Plyscraper
- Lumber
- Plywood
