= Sumitomo Forestry =

Japanese wood company

- Native name: 住友林業株式会社
- Type: Company
- Founded: 1691
- Headquarters: Tokyo, Japan
- Area served: Japan; United States; South Korea; China; Australia
- Services: Lumber and housing
- Website: sfc.jp/english/

Sumitomo Forestry (Japanese: 住友林業株式会社) is a Japanese logging and processing company. It is also engaged in the construction of houses made of wooden materials. The company is included in the Sumitomo Group keiretsu.

At present, the company controls 40,500 hectares of forest in Japan. In addition to logging, the company produces building and finishing materials made of wood, as well as metal and ceramic building materials. Sumitomo Forestry is also active in wooden house construction in Japan, the United States, China, South Korea, and elsewhere. The company is a leader in this segment in Japan. The company also owns Texas-based homebuilder Brightland Homes, formerly Gehan Homes, and Charlotte-based developer Crescent Communities in the US.

It is the developer of the proposed wooden skyscraper W350 Project.

== History ==
Sumitomo began harvesting its own timber in 1691 to meet the needs of its copper smelter.

In 1894, the company began to plant artificial forests for their subsequent harvesting.

The logging business was spun off into a separate department in 1898.

During the Second World War (from 1942), the company began to harvest wood in Indonesia on the islands of Sumatra, Borneo, and Java.

In 1948, the Sumitomo zaibatsu was effectively liquidated and the forestry business was spun off into a separate entity. Sumitomo Forestry itself was formed in 1955 by merging Toho Norin Co., Ltd. and Shikoku Ringyo Co., Ltd.

In 1964, the company started building real estate from timber.

In 1970, a subsidiary, P.T., was established in Indonesia. Kutai Timber Indonesia. The production of plywood is also organized here.

In 1986, a subsidiary company, Nelson Pine Industries Ltd., was created in New Zealand, where the production of fiberboard was organized.

In 1990, the company was listed on the Tokyo Stock Exchange.

In 1991, in Indonesia, the company switched to a reforestation scheme.

In 1993, Sumitomo Forestry established the INOS Group to strengthen its position in the timber housing market.

In 2001, Sumitomo Forestry Crest Co., Ltd. was established as a result of the merger of Sumitomo Forestry Crex Co., Ltd., Sumirin Holz Co., Ltd., Sumirin Plywood Industries, Ltd. and Fuji Incombustible Building Materials Industry Co., Ltd.

In 2003, the company entered the US wooden housing market in Seattle. It entered the Chinese market in 2004.

In 2006, the company merged with Ataka Kenzai Co., Ltd. In the same year, it entered the commercial real estate market of South Korea.

Sumitomo Forestry also operates in Australia. In October 2009, the company acquired a 50 per cent stake in home building company Henley Homes before increasing its stake to 69.4 per cent in October 2020. Sumitomo Forestry acquired 51 per cent stakes in New South Wales home builder Wisdom Group in August 2016, Western Australian building company Scott Park Group in January 2020 and landscaping company Regal Innovations in May 2022. In September 2024, the company announced it would acquire a 51 per cent stake in Australian home builder Metricon for A$115 million.

In May 2026, Sumitomo Forestry completed its acquisition of U.S. homebuilder Tri Pointe Homes for US$47 per share, following an agreement announced in February that valued the transaction at approximately US$4.5 billion. Tri Pointe became a wholly owned subsidiary of Sumitomo Forestry America and ceased trading on the New York Stock Exchange. The acquisition added more than 160 active communities across 13 U.S. states to the group. Tri Pointe and its affiliated companies were subsequently consolidated into Sumitomo Forestry's financial results.
