= W350 Project =

- Location within Japan

General information
- Status: Proposed
- Type: Skyscraper
- Classification: Plyscraper
- Location: Tokyo, Japan
- Coordinates: 35°39′10″N 139°50′22″E
- Groundbreaking: 2024
- Estimated completion: 2041
- Cost: $5.6 billion
- Landlord: Sumitomo Forestry

Height
- Height: 350 m (1,150 ft)

Technical details
- Material: Wood
- Floor count: 70
- Floor area: 455,000 m^{2} (4,900,000 sq ft)

Design and construction
- Architecture firm: Nikken Sekkei

The W350 Project is a proposed wooden skyscraper in central Tokyo, Japan, announced in 2018. The skyscraper is set to reach a height of 350 meters with 70 floors, which upon its completion will make it the tallest wooden skyscraper, as well as Japan's tallest building. The skyscraper is set to be a mixed-used building including residential, office and retail space. It is scheduled to be completed in 2041, to mark Sumitomo Forestry's 350th anniversary.

== Proposal ==
The plan calls for the building to be made of 90% wood with the rest being steel. Steel braces will be used to enhance resistance to wind and earthquakes, as the area has high levels of seismic activity. One advantage of wood is that timber-based structures have proven to be very resistant to earthquakes. The project requires 185,000 cubic meters of timber (or 6.5 million cubic feet), and plans to revitalize forestry and timber demand in Japan. The choice of wood, aside from aesthetic and seismic concerns, is part of a larger movement aiming to "change cities into forests". Wooden structures are also easier to rebuild or replace than concrete structures if it collapses. Two-thirds of Japan is covered by forest, making it the 2nd most tree-covered country of the OECD countries after Finland. Most of Japan's cedars and cypresses were planted after the Second World War and are now reaching maturity.

The skyscraper is designed by the architectural firm Nikken Sekkei, and will be built by the developer Sumitomo Forestry.

Its construction is estimated to cost USD 5.6 billion.

== See also ==
- List of tallest wooden buildings
- Brock Commons Tallwood House
- List of tallest buildings in the world
- Plyscraper
