= Brettstapel =

Timber construction system

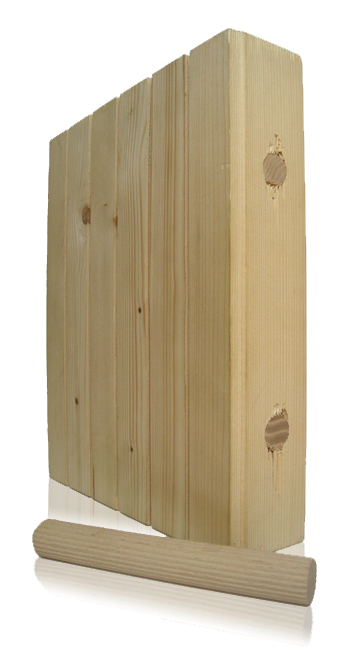
Brettstapel

Brettstapel, also known as dowellam, is a massive timber construction system, fabricated exclusively from softwood timber posts connected with hardwood timber dowels. It is a relatively simple method of construction that exploits low grade timber, not normally suitable for use in construction, to form load bearing solid timber wall, floor and roof panels.

Brettstapel works by using hardwood dowels with a moisture content lower than that of softwood posts. Over time the dowels expand to achieve moisture equilibrium thus 'locking' the posts together and creating a structural load-bearing system.

It is one of a few construction methods that can be entirely fabricated from timber. Although some variations do still use glue and nails, these are not necessary and avoiding these means a healthier indoor air quality can be achieved. The timber itself locks in vast amounts of carbon dioxide without emitting harmful toxins found in other materials, benefiting both the user and the environment.

== History ==
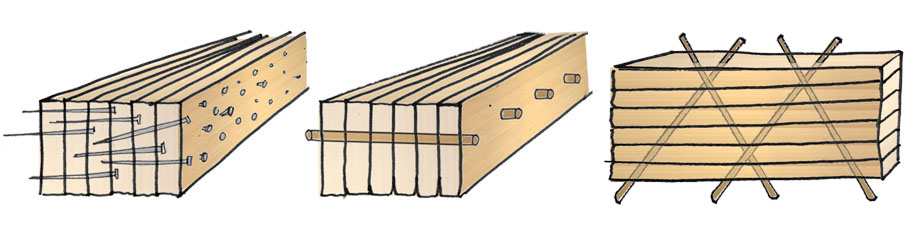
Types of Brettstapel Construction

Brettstapel was invented in the 1970s by the German engineer Julius Natterer. It is now commonly used across Austria, Switzerland and Germany, whilst slowly emerging in the UK. Originally it consisted of low grade timber posts continuously nailed together to form panels strong enough to support mines and railways. In 1999 a German company developed a doweled system which relied on the varying moisture content to form solid structural panels however many companies introduced glue to the system to strengthen it. In 2001, a new variant of Brettstapel was developed where diagonal dowels replaced the perpendicular ones thus resolving separation issues and allowing for longer spans. Presently only one company uses the diagonal dowel system whilst all except for two (who still use nails) use perpendicular dowels, mostly without glue. There are now a range of companies producing CLT cross laminated timber (rotating layers of boards) using timber dowels based upon Brettstapel.

== Manufacture ==
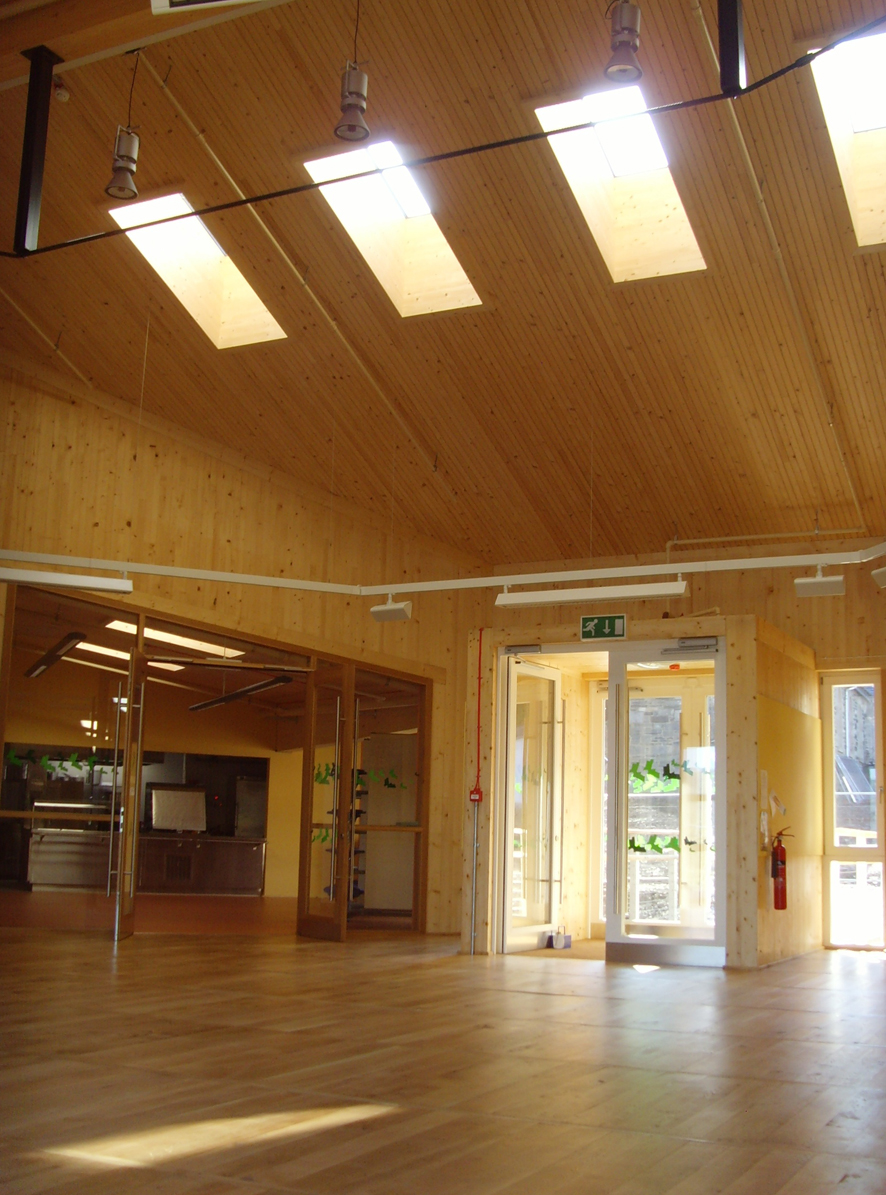
Acharacle Primary School Exposed Brettstapel

Throughout the development of Brettstapel, low grade wood (predominantly spruce or fir) has remained the choice raw material for the posts where-as beech is more often used for the dowels. By ensuring natural defects, such as knots in the wooden posts are not adjacent to each other, poor quality timber can be utilised which makes for a highly economical way of using a fast-growing, underused resource, of which the UK and Scotland in particular, has an abundance.

Brettstapel is manufactured to three quality grades depending on how visible the final product will be: Industrial, Standard and Exposed. With this in mind, the most rudimentary solution is to use unfinished timber where the panels are to be covered. Alternatively, the posts can be planed, chamfered and profiled to give a highly aesthetic finish and further still, the posts can be altered with hollow voids along the edge to enhance the acoustic performance. Brettstapel can also be combined with concrete and steel to form composite structures for more demanding projects such as large spans, bridges and trusses.

== Application ==
Brettstapel is commonly produced as part of a prefabricated wall, ceiling or roof panel. The prefabrication takes place in dedicated factories using specialist machinery and an experienced team ensuring tight quality control and fast construction.

The structural panels are generally manufactured in 600mm wide sections, secured together using timber joints and further combined with sheathing board, insulation, and a vapour barrier to form the completed panels. Structural openings are incorporated into the panels, and in some cases plumbing and electrical fittings can be too, whilst the external finish commonly varies between render and timber cladding which is applied on-site.

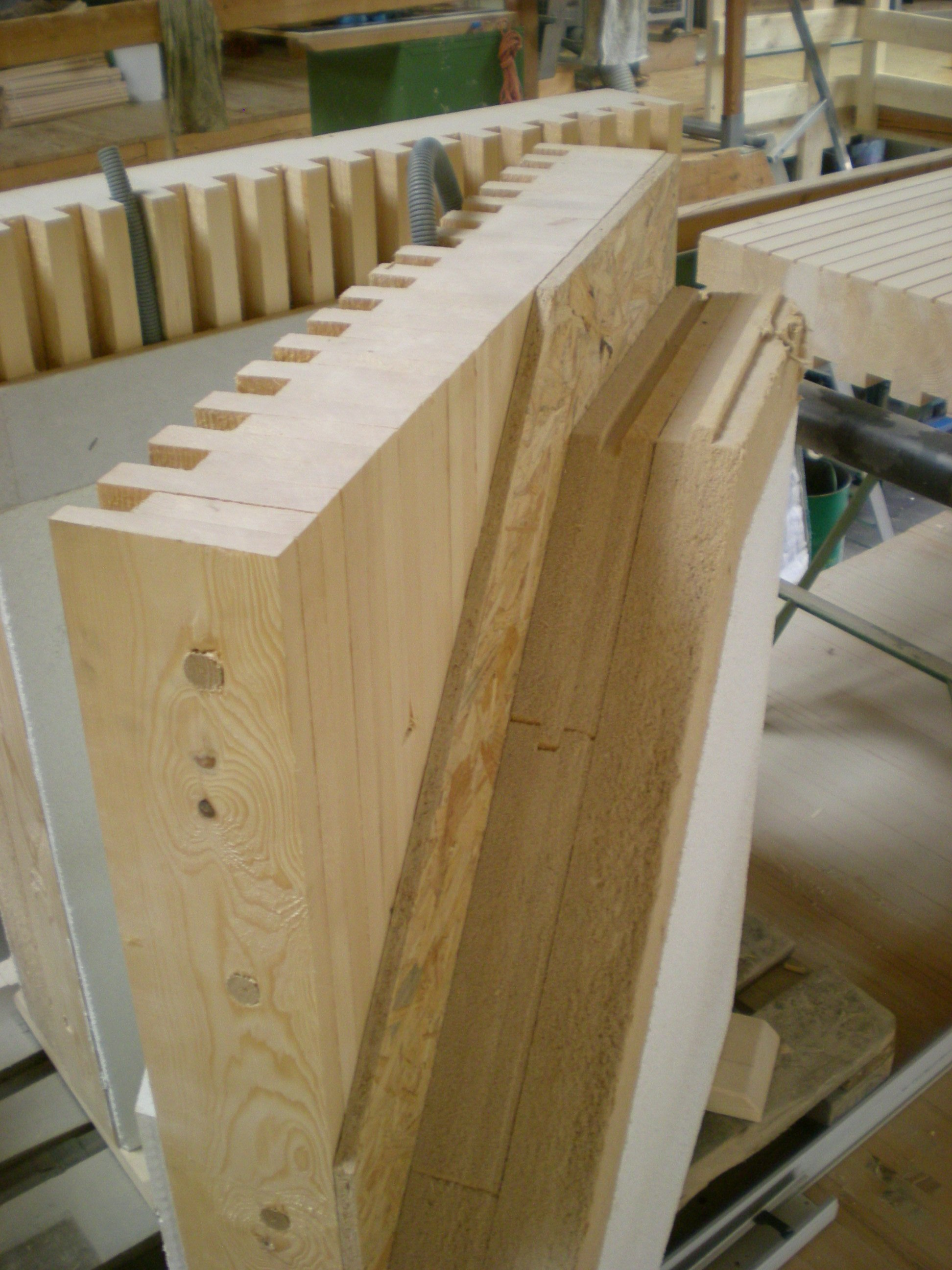
Brettstapel Wall Panel

This high degree of prefabrication means buildings can be manufactured and erected extremely quickly and efficiently. It takes approximately five weeks from cutting dried timber to completing the fit-out of a house, whilst a house can be erected on site and made weather tight in a matter of days.

Structurally, manufacturers can produce panels up to 12–15 metres in length, although a 7metre span is more readily achievable with a 210-250mm deep panel. Brettstapel trusses can be made to span more demanding distances, such as those required in large industrial units and bridges.

The tallest building to use Brettstapel panels is currently the “E3” building in Germany at seven storeys tall. Although this incorporates other timber elements, four storey buildings have been erected solely using Brettstapel for the structure. Fire regulations currently limit the height of a timber building, however these are being challenged by the massive timber systems and taller examples are emerging; a typical 120mm panel has a 60 minute rating whilst complete structural panels can achieve 90 minute ratings which more than matches concrete and steel construction methods.

Contemporary Brettstapel construction is also employed in the IBA Soft House in Hamburg, Germany. Whereas the timber skeleton of the E3 building is obscured by plaster, the Brettstapel panels in the Soft House are exposed on the interior floors, walls, and ceilings. The building was then clad in layers of mineral wool insulation, a water barrier, and a larch wood rainscreen to ensure stability against the elements.

== Benefits ==
- Carbon dioxide is one of the biggest contributors to global warming. Considering timber locks in 930 kilograms of carbon dioxide per cubic metre, (the equivalent to taking a car off the road for two months) a Brettstapel building sequesters significantly more carbon than a timber frame one.
- Brettstapel has excellent thermal properties and if used efficiently could reduce energy demands by up to 90% due to its low U-values, airtight construction and high thermal mass, approximately five times higher than timber frame. Alone it has a thermal conductivity of 0.13 W/(m⋅K) and complete structural panels achieve U-values between 0.12 and 0.24 W/(m^{2}⋅K).
- The ability to prefabricate buildings offsite and erect them quickly has practical and economical advantages to the British construction industry, especially considering the poor climate.
- The reduced energy demand, along with the shorter and less labour-intensive construction period, contributes significantly towards lower lifecycle costs of a building. This offsets the higher material cost; Brettstapel is approximately 20% more expensive than an equivalent area of timber frame construction.
- Specifying untreated, exposed Brettstapel, without glue and nails, helps to produce a healthy indoor environment that is free from potentially harmful compounds found in other materials; this is further enhanced by the hygroscopic nature of the prefabricated panels.

== British Industry ==
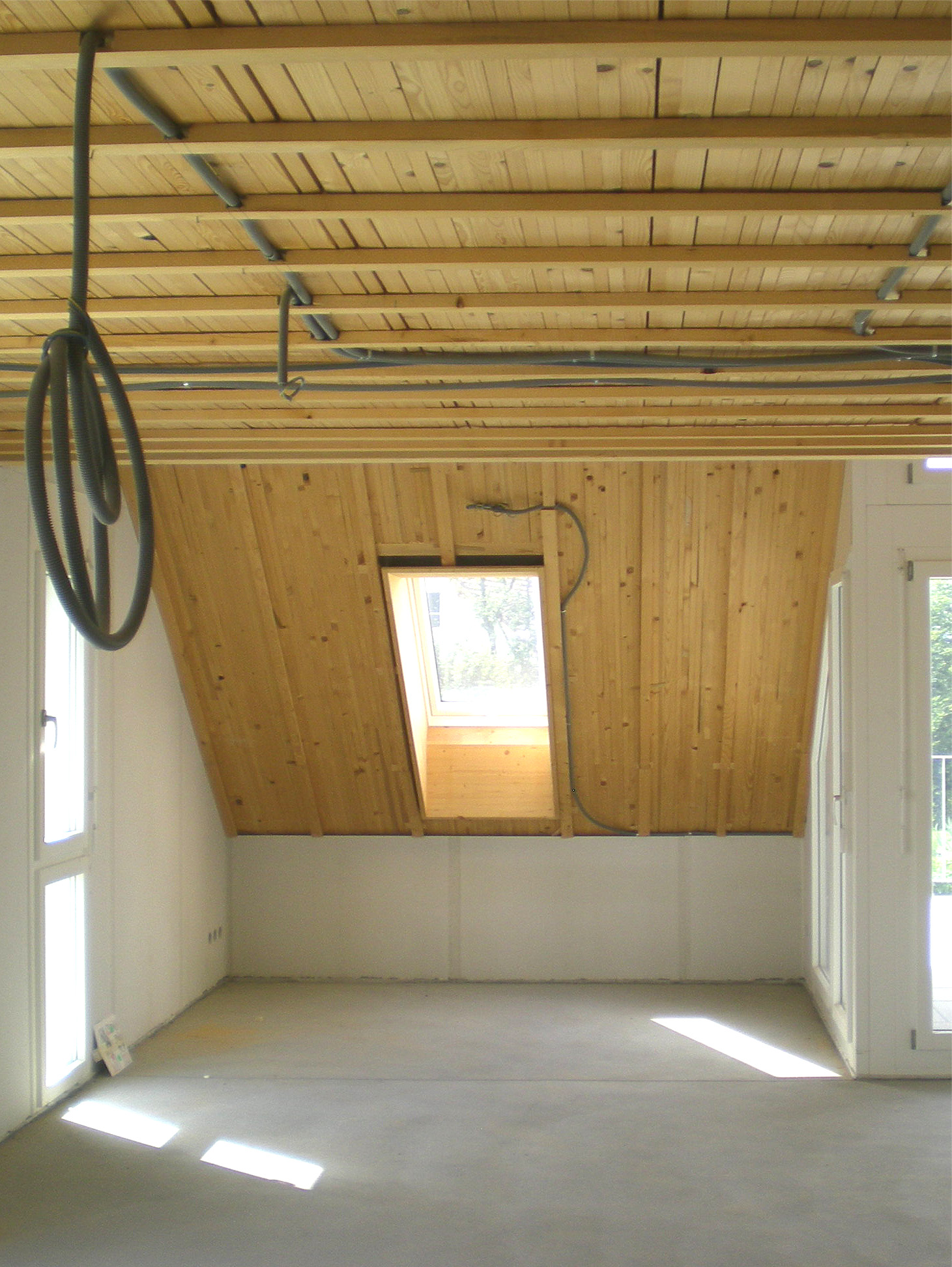
Industrial Grade Brettstapel

Brettstapel projects are starting to be realised in the UK, Acharacle Primary School in Scotland being the first and setting a fitting precedent for others to follow. Some private and public housing projects are also being built in the Scottish borders and in London. Plummerswood Active House in the Scottish Borders has received the Scottish Home Award for Architectural Excellence 2012.

Currently Brettstapel is predominantly manufactured in Austria, Switzerland, Germany and Norway which has a negative effect on British users, due to increased transportation costs and a subsequently a higher embodied energy. British architects and clients are however slowly starting to use massive timber systems more frequently, but for all the benefits this brings, the British timber industry has been missing out.

However as of Spring 2013 In-Wood Developments in EastSussex is believed to be the first UK manufacturer of Brettstapel Panels in the UK, bringing this construction opportunity to the UK market on a more competitive basis. The first showing of these UK manufactured panels was made at Ecobuild 2013.

Scotland produces the majority of UK timber, 65% of which is used for woodchips, fencing, packaging and sawdust, this is timber that could be used in Brettstapel construction. British grown Sitka spruce is an ideal raw material to use for Brettstapel as it is a low coat timber that grows quickly and accounts for approximately third of all timber in the UK. If enough interest is generated, it is possible to conceive that the industry will soon have an incentive to produce more Brettstapel in the UK using Sitka spruce; this would be a highly profitable use of a resource that is currently predominantly used for cheaper products.

Increasing the use of British timber will have huge ecological and economical benefits to the global environment and to British industries. Ultimately however, specifying Brettstapel within the UK will contribute towards a higher quality of construction; a higher standard of living; an improved environment and towards the increased health and well-being of future occupants.
