= List of architecture schools in India =

This is a list of Architecture Schools in India recognised by the Council of Architecture for providing architectural education, resulting in the awarding of degrees in Bachelor of Architecture (B.Arch) and Master of Architecture (M.Arch).

== Architectural education ==
The architectural education in India includes educational activities involved in the education and training of architects in India. It is regulated by the Council of Architecture.

=== Pathway ===
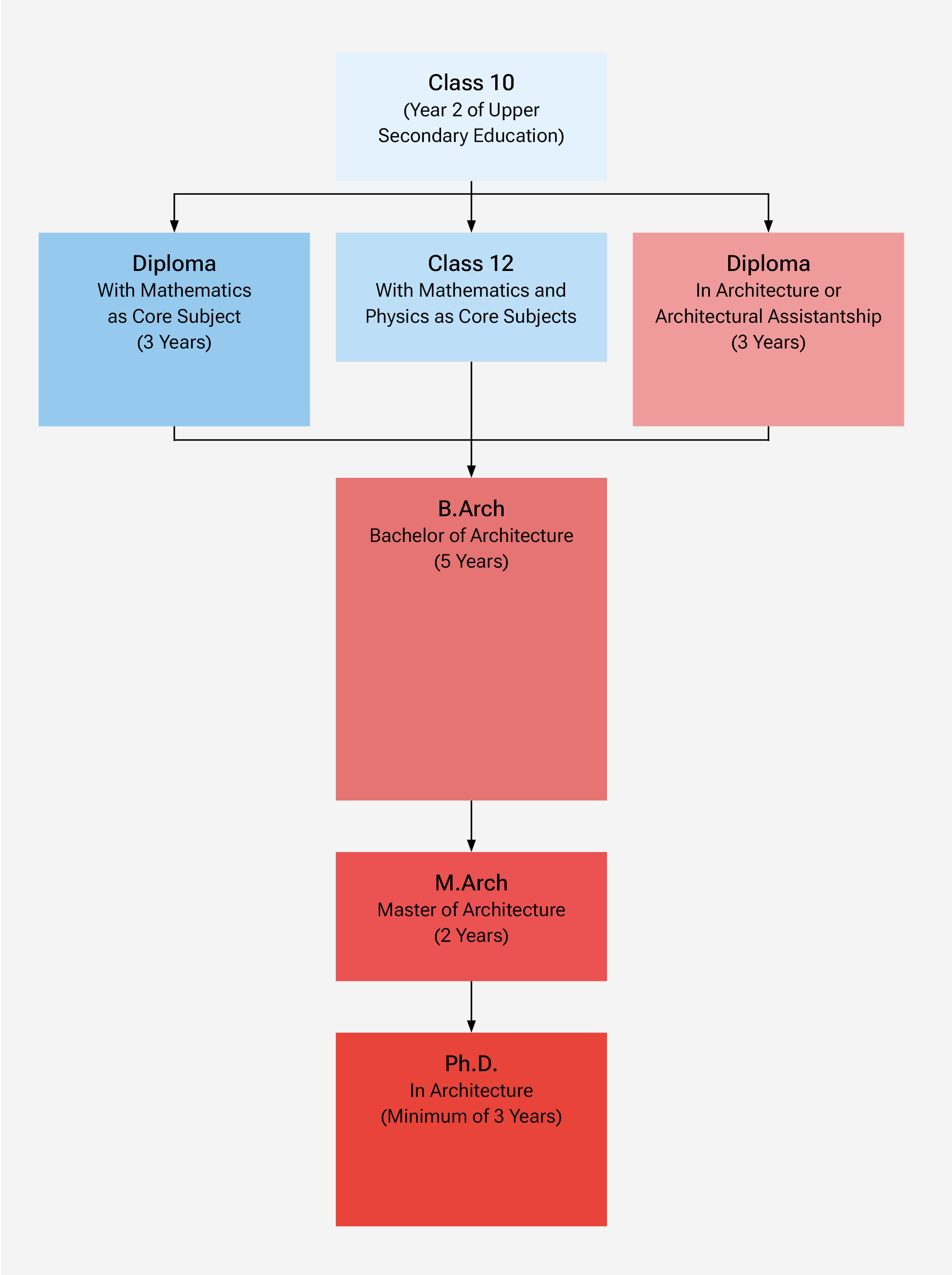
Outline of architectural education in India

The following provides typical outline of architectural education in India:

- Diploma in Architecture or Architectural Assistantship is a 3-year long diploma (ISCED level 4) programme. Candidates are required to have completed the second year of Upper Secondary Education (Class 10). Graduates are eligible for admission to undergraduate programmes.
- Bachelor of Architecture (B.Arch) is a 5-year long undergraduate professional (ISCED level 6) programme. Candidates are required to have completed the 12th grade of school (ISCED level 3) or diploma (ISCED level 4) with mathematics as core course. Additionally, candidates are required to pass the admission test National Aptitude Test in Architecture (NATA). Graduates are eligible to register as an architect and for admission to postgraduate programmes. Additionally, graduates with ten years experience in teaching, research and professional practice are eligible for admission to doctoral programmes in architecture.
- Master of Architecture (M.Arch) is a 2-year long postgraduate (ISCED level 7) programme. Candidates are required to have completed Bachelor of Architecture (B.Arch) or equivalent recognised by the Council of Architecture. Additionally, candidates are required to pass the admission test Postgraduate Entrance Test in Architecture (PGETA). Graduates are eligible for admission to doctoral programmes in architecture.
- Doctor of Philosophy (PhD) in Architecture is a terminal degree (ISCED level 8) programme. Candidates are required to have completed Master of Architecture (M.Arch) or postgraduate degree in allied fields. Additionally, Bachelor of Architecture (B.Arch) graduates with ten years experience in teaching, research and professional practice are eligible for admission.

=== Regulatory body ===
The Council of Architecture is a statutory body constituted by the Indian Ministry of Education under the Architects Act of 1972. It is responsible for regulation of architectural education and practice of architecture throughout India. It approves higher education institutions in India to provide a 5-year long Bachelor of Architecture (B.Arch) and a 2-year long Master of Architecture (M.Arch) degrees.

== List ==
NIRF Rank 2024 denotes the rank of the school in National Institutional Ranking Framework under the category of Architecture and Planning.

* Denotes architecture school is affiliate member of the Indian Institute of Architects.

Architecture and Planning Schools in India
Name of the School	Degree-awarding University	Programmes Offered	Location	State	NIRF Rank 2024
AU College of Engineering	Andhra University	B.Arch	Visakhapatnam	Andhra Pradhesh	—
JSAA	O.P. Jindal Global University	B.Arch	Sonipat	Haryana	
ANU College of Architecture & Planning	Acharya Nagarjuna University	B.Arch	Guntur	Andhra Pradhesh	—
GITAM School of Architecture	Gandhi Institute of Technology and Management	B.Arch	Visakhapatnam	Andhra Pradhesh	39
GITAM School of Architecture	Gandhi Institute of Technology and Management	M.Arch in Sustainable Architecture	Visakhapatnam	Andhra Pradhesh	39
SPA Vijayawada	Schools of Planning and Architecture	B.Arch	Vijayawada	Andhra Pradhesh	16
SPA Vijayawada	Schools of Planning and Architecture	B.Plan	Vijayawada	Andhra Pradhesh	16
SPA Vijayawada	Schools of Planning and Architecture	M.Plan in Environmental Planning Management	Vijayawada	Andhra Pradhesh	16
SPA Vijayawada	Schools of Planning and Architecture	M.Plan in Urban and Regional Planning	Vijayawada	Andhra Pradhesh	16
SPA Vijayawada	Schools of Planning and Architecture	M.Plan in Transportation and Infrastructure Planning	Vijayawada	Andhra Pradhesh	16
MRK College of Architecture	Jawaharlal Nehru Architecture and Fine Arts University	B.Arch	Veeravasaram	Andhra Pradhesh	—
KLEF School of Architecture	Koneru Lakshmaiah Education Foundation	B.Arch	Guntur	Andhra Pradhesh	—
Chadalawada Aruna School of Architecture	Jawaharlal Nehru Technological University	B.Arch	Chittoor	Andhra Pradhesh	—
School of Planning and Architecture	Dr. YSR Architecture and Fine Arts University	B.Arch	Kadapa	Andhra Pradhesh	—
Guwahati College of Architecture	Assam Science and Technology University	B.Arch	Guwahati	Assam	—
Guwahati College of Architecture	Assam Science and Technology University	M.Plan in Urban and Regional Planning	Guwahati	Assam	—
Royal School of Architecture	The Assam Royal Global University	B.Arch	Guwahati	Assam	—
NIT Patna	National Institute of Technology	B.Arch	Patna	Bihar	27
NIT Patna	National Institute of Technology	M.Plan in Urban and Regional Planning	Patna	Bihar	27
School of Architecture	Bihar Engineering University	B.Arch	Patna	Bihar	—
NIT Raipur	National Institute of Technology	B.Arch	Raipur	Chhattisgarh	36
Amity School of Architecture and Planning	Amity University, Raipur	B.Arch	Raipur	Chhattisgarh	—
Department of Urban Planning	Chhattisgarh Swami Vivekanand Technical University	M.Plan in Urban Planning	Bhilai	Chhattisgarh	—
Chandigarh College of Architecture	Panjab University	B.Arch	Chandigarh	Chandigarh	30
Chandigarh College of Architecture	Panjab University	M.Arch	Chandigarh	Chandigarh	30
SPA New Delhi	School of Planning and Architecture	B.Arch	New Delhi	New Delhi	5
SPA New Delhi	School of Planning and Architecture	M.Plan in Environmental Planning	New Delhi	New Delhi	5
SPA New Delhi	School of Planning and Architecture	M.Plan in Housing	New Delhi	New Delhi	5
SPA New Delhi	School of Planning and Architecture	M.Plan in Regional Planning	New Delhi	New Delhi	5
SPA New Delhi	School of Planning and Architecture	M.Plan in Transport Planning	New Delhi	New Delhi	5
SPA New Delhi	School of Planning and Architecture	M.Plan in Urban Planning	New Delhi	New Delhi	5
Vastu Kala Academy	Guru Gobind Singh Indraprastha University	B.Arch	New Delhi	New Delhi	—
Faculty of Architecture and Ekistics	Jamia Milia Islamia	B.Arch	New Delhi	New Delhi	7
Faculty of Architecture and Ekistics	Jamia Milia Islamia	M.Plan	New Delhi	New Delhi	7
University School of Architecture and Planning	Guru Gobind Singh Indraprastha University	B.Arch	New Delhi	New Delhi	29
University School of Architecture and Planning	Guru Gobind Singh Indraprastha University	M.Arch in Urban Design	New Delhi	New Delhi	29
University School of Architecture and Planning	Guru Gobind Singh Indraprastha University	M.Plan in Urban and Regional Planning	New Delhi	New Delhi	29
MBS School of Planning and Architecture	Guru Gobind Singh Indraprastha University	B.Arch	New Delhi	New Delhi	—
Department of Architecture and Planning	Indira Gandhi Delhi Technical University for Women	B.Arch	New Delhi	New Delhi	—
Department of Architecture and Planning	Indira Gandhi Delhi Technical University for Women	M.Plan in Urban Planning	New Delhi	New Delhi	—
Department of Architecture and Planning	Netaji Subhas University of Technology	B.Arch	New Delhi	New Delhi	—
Goa College of Architecture	Goa University	B.Arch	Panaji	Goa	—
Goa College of Architecture	Goa University	M.Arch in Sustainable Habitat	Panaji	Goa	—
Goa College of Architecture	Goa University	M.Arch in Urban Design	Panaji	Goa	—
Faculty of Architecture	Maharaja Sayajirao University of Baroda	B.Arch	Vadodara	Gujarat	—
Faculty of Architecture	Maharaja Sayajirao University of Baroda	M.Plan in Urban and Regional Planning	Vadodara	Gujarat	—
CEPT Faculty of Architecture	Centre for Environmental Planning and Technology University	B.Arch	Ahmedabad	Gujarat	6
CEPT Faculty of Architecture	Centre for Environmental Planning and Technology University	B.Plan	Ahmedabad	Gujarat	6
CEPT Faculty of Architecture	Centre for Environmental Planning and Technology University	M.Plan in Urban Planning	Ahmedabad	Gujarat	6
CEPT Faculty of Architecture	Centre for Environmental Planning and Technology University	M.Plan in Housing	Ahmedabad	Gujarat	6
CEPT Faculty of Architecture	Centre for Environmental Planning and Technology University	M.Plan in Infrastructure	Ahmedabad	Gujarat	6
CEPT Faculty of Architecture	Centre for Environmental Planning and Technology University	M.Plan in Transport Systems	Ahmedabad	Gujarat	6
Arvindbhai Patel Institute of Environmental Design	Sardar Patel University	B.Arch	Vallabh Vidyanagar	Gujarat	—
Arvindbhai Patel Institute of Environmental Design	Sardar Patel University	M.Plan in Urban and Regional Planning	Vallabh Vidyanagar	Gujarat	—
Sarvajanik Institute of Design, Planning and Technology	Sarvajanik University	B.Arch	Surat	Gujarat	—
Sarvajanik Institute of Design, Planning and Technology	Sarvajanik University	M.Arch in Urban Design	Surat	Gujarat	—
Sarvajanik Institute of Design, Planning and Technology	Sarvajanik University	M.Plan in Urban and Regional Planning	Surat	Gujarat	—
College of Architecture	Sardar Patel University	B.Arch	Vallabh Vidyanagar	Gujarat	—
Indubhai Parekh School of Architecture	Saurashtra University	B.Arch	Rajkot	Gujarat	—
Indubhai Parekh School of Architecture	Saurashtra University	M.Plan in Urban and Regional Planning	Rajkot	Gujarat	—
Institute of Architecture	Hemchandracharya North Gujarat University	B.Arch	Patan	Gujarat	—
Shri Gijubhai Chhaganbhai Patel Institute of Architecture, Interior Design and Fine Arts	Veer Narmad South Gujarat University	B.Arch	Surat	Gujarat	—
School of Architecture	Anant National University	B.Arch	Ahmedabad	Gujarat	37
School of Architecture	Anant National University	M.Arch	Ahmedabad	Gujarat	37
School of Design and Architecture	Navrachana University	B.Arch	Vadodara	Gujarat	—
Parul Institute of Architecture and Planning	Parul University	B.Arch	Vadodara	Gujarat	—
Parul Institute of Architecture and Planning	Parul University	M.Plan in Urban and Regional Planning	Vadodara	Gujarat	—
Institute of Design, Environment and Architecture	Indus University	B.Arch	Ahmedabad	Gujarat	—
Bhagwan Mahavir College of Architecture	Bhagwan Mahavir University	B.Arch	Surat	Gujarat	—
Bhagwan Mahavir College of Architecture	Bhagwan Mahavir University	M.Plan	Surat	Gujarat	—
L.J. School of Architecture and Planning	L.J. Institute of Engineering and Technology	B.Arch	Ahmedabad	Gujarat	—
L.J. School of Architecture and Planning	L.J. Institute of Engineering and Technology	M.Plan in Urban and Regional Planning	Ahmedabad	Gujarat	—
Raman Bhakta School of Architecture	Uka Tarsadia University	B.Arch	Surat	Gujarat	—
Institute of Architecture and Planning	Nirma University	B.Arch	Ahmedabad	Gujarat	19
Institute of Architecture and Planning	Nirma University	B.Plan	Ahmedabad	Gujarat	19
Institute of Architecture and Planning	Nirma University	M.Arch in Urban Design	Ahmedabad	Gujarat	19
Swarrnim Institute of Design	Swarrnim Startup & Innovation University	B.Arch	Gandhinagar	Gujarat	—
Swarrnim Institute of Design	Swarrnim Startup & Innovation University	M.Plan in Urban Planning	Gandhinagar	Gujarat	—
Sal School of Architecture	Gujarat Technological University	B.Arch	Ahmedabad	Gujarat	—
Sal School of Architecture	Gujarat Technological University	M.Arch	Ahmedabad	Gujarat	—
NIT Hamirpur	National Institute of Technology	B.Arch	Hamirpur	Himachal Pradesh	32
Sushant School of Art and Architecture	Sushant University	B.Arch	Gurgaon	Haryana	—
Sushant School of Art and Architecture	Sushant University	M.Arch in Urban Design	Gurgaon	Haryana	—
Faculty of Architecture, Urban and Town Planning	Deenbandhu Chhotu Ram University of Science and Technology	B.Arch	Sonipat	Haryana	—
Faculty of Architecture, Urban and Town Planning	Deenbandhu Chhotu Ram University of Science and Technology	M.Arch in Sustainable Architecture	Sonipat	Haryana	—
Faculty of Architecture, Urban and Town Planning	Deenbandhu Chhotu Ram University of Science and Technology	Master of Urban and Rural Planning	Sonipat	Haryana	—
Ganga Institute of Architecture and Town Planning	Maharshi Dayanand University	B.Arch	Rohtak	Haryana	—
Ganga Institute of Architecture and Town Planning	Maharshi Dayanand University	M.Arch in Landscape Architecture	Rohtak	Haryana	—
Hindu College of Design, Architecture and Planning	Deenbandhu Chhotu Ram University of Science and Technology	B.Arch	Sonipat	Haryana	—
Hindu College of Design, Architecture and Planning	Deenbandhu Chhotu Ram University of Science and Technology	Master of Urban and Rural Planning	Sonipat	Haryana	—
Department of Architecture and Planning	Birla Institute of Technology, Mesra	B.Arch	Ranchi	Jharkhand	20
School of Architecture and Landscaping	Shri Mata Vaishno Devi University	B.Arch	Katra	Jammu and Kashmir	31
Manipal School of Architecture and Planning	Manipal Academy of Higher Education	B.Arch	Udupi	Karnataka	28
Manipal School of Architecture and Planning	Manipal Academy of Higher Education	M.Arch in Urban Design and Development	Udupi	Karnataka	28
BMS College of Architecture, Design and Planning	Visvesvaraya Technological University	B.Arch	Bangalore	Karnataka	23
BMS College of Architecture, Design and Planning	Visvesvaraya Technological University	M.Arch in Habitat Design	Bangalore	Karnataka	23
Dayananda Sagar College of Architecture	Visvesvaraya Technological University	B.Arch	Bangalore	Karnataka	—
Dayananda Sagar College of Architecture	Visvesvaraya Technological University	M.Arch in Interior Design	Bangalore	Karnataka	—
Malik Sandal Institute of Art & Architecture	Visvesvaraya Technological University	B.Arch	Bagalkot	Karnataka	—
Malik Sandal Institute of Art & Architecture	Visvesvaraya Technological University	M.Arch in Construction Project Management	Bagalkot	Karnataka	—
M.S. Ramaiah Institute of Technology	Visvesvaraya Technological University	B.Arch	Bangalore	Karnataka	21
M.S. Ramaiah Institute of Technology	Visvesvaraya Technological University	M.Arch in Landscape Architecture	Bangalore	Karnataka	21
R.V. College of Architecture	Visvesvaraya Technological University	B.Arch	Bangalore	Karnataka	—
R.V. College of Architecture	Visvesvaraya Technological University	M.Arch in Urban Design	Bangalore	Karnataka	—
School of Planning and Architecture	University of Mysore	B.Arch	Mysore	Karnataka	—
School of Planning and Architecture	University of Mysore	M.Arch in Urban Design	Mysore	Karnataka	—
BMS School of Architecture, Yelahanka	Visvesvaraya Technological University	B.Arch	Bangalore	Karnataka	38
BMS School of Architecture, Yelahanka	Visvesvaraya Technological University	M.Arch in Urban Design	Bangalore	Karnataka	38
SJB School of Architecture and Planning	Visvesvaraya Technological University	B.Arch	Bangalore	Karnataka	—
SJB School of Architecture and Planning	Visvesvaraya Technological University	M.Arch in Construction Project Management	Bangalore	Karnataka	—
Impact School of Architecture	Visvesvaraya Technological University	B.Arch	Bangalore	Karnataka	—
Impact School of Architecture	Visvesvaraya Technological University	M.Arch in Digital Architecture	Bangalore	Karnataka	—
Gopalan School of Architecture and Planning	Visvesvaraya Technological University	B.Arch	Bangalore	Karnataka	—
Gopalan School of Architecture and Planning	Visvesvaraya Technological University	M.Arch in Construction Project Management	Bangalore	Karnataka	—
Wadiyar Centre For Architecture	Visvesvaraya Technological University	B.Arch	Mysore	Karnataka	—
Wadiyar Centre For Architecture	Visvesvaraya Technological University	M.Arch in Sustainable Architecture	Mysore	Karnataka	—
School of Architecture	Reva University	B.Arch	Bangalore	Karnataka	—
School of Architecture	Reva University	M.Arch	Bangalore	Karnataka	—
School of Architecture	Christ University	B.Arch	Bangalore	Karnataka	—
School of Architecture	Christ University	M.Arch in Urban Design and Development	Bangalore	Karnataka	—
Trivandrum College of Engineering	APJ Abdul Kalam Technological University	B.Arch	Thiruvananthapuram	Kerala	18
Trivandrum College of Engineering	APJ Abdul Kalam Technological University	M.Arch in Environmental Design	Thiruvananthapuram	Kerala	18
Trivandrum College of Engineering	APJ Abdul Kalam Technological University	M.Arch in Urban Design	Thiruvananthapuram	Kerala	18
MES School of Architecture	APJ Abdul Kalam Technological University	B.Arch	Thiruvananthapuram	Kerala	—
MES School of Architecture	APJ Abdul Kalam Technological University	M.Arch in Sustainable Architecture	Thiruvananthapuram	Kerala	—
NIT Calicut	National Institute of Technology	B.Arch	Kozhikode	Kerala	3
Devaki Ammas Guruvayurappan College of Architecture	University of Calicut	B.Arch	Malappuram	Kerala	—
Devaki Ammas Guruvayurappan College of Architecture	University of Calicut	M.Arch in Landscape Architecture	Malappuram	Kerala	—
Asian School of Architecture and Design Innovations	Mahatma Gandhi University, Kerala	B.Arch	Kochi	Kerala	—
Asian School of Architecture and Design Innovations	Mahatma Gandhi University, Kerala	M.Arch in Advanced Architecture	Kochi	Kerala	—
Sir J.J. College of Architecture	University of Mumbai	B.Arch	Mumbai	Maharashtra	—
L.S. Raheja School of Architecture	University of Mumbai	B.Arch	Mumbai	Maharashtra	—
Rachana Sansad Academy of Architecture	University of Mumbai	B.Arch	Mumbai	Maharashtra	—
Visvesvaraya National Institute of Technology	National Institute of Technology	B.Arch	Nagpur	Maharashtra	10
Marathwada Institute of Technology	Dr. Babasaheb Ambedkar Technological University	B.Arch	Aurangabad	Maharashtra	—
Marathwada Institute of Technology	Dr. Babasaheb Ambedkar Technological University	M.Arch in Urban Design	Aurangabad	Maharashtra	—
Shivaji College of Architecture	Shivaji University	B.Arch	Kolhapur	Maharashtra	—
Shivaji College of Architecture	Shivaji University	M.Arch in Architectural and Construction Project Management	Kolhapur	Maharashtra	—
Marathwada Mitra Mandals College of Architecture	Savitribai Phule Pune University	B.Arch	Pune	Maharashtra	—
Marathwada Mitra Mandals College of Architecture	Savitribai Phule Pune University	M.Arch in Design and Project Management	Pune	Maharashtra	—
Jawahar Lal Nehru Engineering College	MGM University	B.Arch	Aurangabad	Maharashtra	—
Jawahar Lal Nehru Engineering College	MGM University	M.Arch	Aurangabad	Maharashtra	—
Jawahar Lal Nehru Engineering College	MGM University	M.Arch in Environmental Architecture	Aurangabad	Maharashtra	—
MVP Samajs College of Architecture	Savitribai Phule Pune University	B.Arch	Nashik	Maharashtra	—
MVP Samajs College of Architecture	Savitribai Phule Pune University	M.Arch in Environmental Architecture	Nashik	Maharashtra	—
Bharati Vidyapeeths College of Architecture	University of Mumbai	B.Arch	Navi Mumbai	Maharashtra	—
Bharati Vidyapeeths College of Architecture	University of Mumbai	M.Arch in Project Management	Navi Mumbai	Maharashtra	—
Kamala Raheja Vidyanidhi Institute for Architecture and Environmental Studies	University of Mumbai	B.Arch	Mumbai	Maharashtra	—
Kamala Raheja Vidyanidhi Institute for Architecture and Environmental Studies	University of Mumbai	M.Arch in Urban Design	Mumbai	Maharashtra	—
D.Y. Patil School of Architecture	Ajeenkya DY Patil University	B.Arch	Navi Mumbai	Maharashtra	—
D.Y. Patil School of Architecture	Ajeenkya DY Patil University	M.Arch in Urban Design	Navi Mumbai	Maharashtra	—
Pillai College of Architecture	University of Mumbai	B.Arch	Navi Mumbai	Maharashtra	—
Pillai College of Architecture	University of Mumbai	M.Arch in Urban Design	Navi Mumbai	Maharashtra	—
Rizvi College of Architecture	University of Mumbai	B.Arch	Mumbai	Maharashtra	—
Rizvi College of Architecture	University of Mumbai	M.Arch in Urban Design	Mumbai	Maharashtra	—
Bharati Vidyapeeth College of Architecture	Bharati Vidyapeeth University	B.Arch	Pune	Maharashtra	—
Bharati Vidyapeeth College of Architecture	Bharati Vidyapeeth University	M.Arch in Sustainable Architecture	Pune	Maharashtra	—
Shrimati Manoramabai Mundle College Of Architecture	Rashtrasant Tukadoji Maharaj Nagpur University	B.Arch	Nagpur	Maharashtra	—
Shrimati Manoramabai Mundle College Of Architecture	Rashtrasant Tukadoji Maharaj Nagpur University	M.Arch in Urban Design	Nagpur	Maharashtra	—
Shrimati Manoramabai Mundle College Of Architecture	Rashtrasant Tukadoji Maharaj Nagpur University	M.Arch in Architecture Education	Nagpur	Maharashtra	—
Dr. Bhanuben Nanavati College of Architecture	Savitribai Phule Pune University	B.Arch	Pune	Maharashtra	—
Dr. Bhanuben Nanavati College of Architecture	Savitribai Phule Pune University	M.Arch in Environmental Architecture	Pune	Maharashtra	—
Dr. Bhanuben Nanavati College of Architecture	Savitribai Phule Pune University	M.Arch in Digital Architecture	Pune	Maharashtra	—
Dr. Bhanuben Nanavati College of Architecture	Savitribai Phule Pune University	M.Arch in Landscape Architecture	Pune	Maharashtra	—
Appasaheb Birnale College of Architecture	Shivaji University	B.Arch	Sangli	Maharashtra	—
Appasaheb Birnale College of Architecture	Shivaji University	M.Arch	Sangli	Maharashtra	—
Priyadarshini Institute of Architecture and Design Studies	Rashtrasant Tukadoji Maharaj Nagpur University	B.Arch	Nagpur	Maharashtra	—
Priyadarshini Institute of Architecture and Design Studies	Rashtrasant Tukadoji Maharaj Nagpur University	M.Arch in Landscape Architecture	Nagpur	Maharashtra	—
Priyadarshini Institute of Architecture and Design Studies	Rashtrasant Tukadoji Maharaj Nagpur University	M.Arch in Industrial Design	Nagpur	Maharashtra	—
IES College of Architecture	University of Mumbai	B.Arch	Mumbai	Maharashtra	—
IES College of Architecture	University of Mumbai	M.Arch in Project Management	Mumbai	Maharashtra	—
IES College of Architecture	University of Mumbai	M.Arch in Landscape Architecture	Mumbai	Maharashtra	—
Dr. Baliram Hiray College of Architecture	University of Mumbai	B.Arch	Mumbai	Maharashtra	—
Dr. Baliram Hiray College of Architecture	University of Mumbai	M.Arch in Project Management	Mumbai	Maharashtra	—
Padmabhushan Dr. Vasantdada Patil College of Architecture	Savitribai Phule Pune University	B.Arch	Pune	Maharashtra	—
Padmabhushan Dr. Vasantdada Patil College of Architecture	Savitribai Phule Pune University	M.Arch in Construction Management	Pune	Maharashtra	—
Padmabhushan Dr. Vasantdada Patil College of Architecture	Savitribai Phule Pune University	M.Arch in Landscape Architecture	Pune	Maharashtra	—
Padmabhushan Dr. Vasantdada Patil College of Architecture	Savitribai Phule Pune University	M.Arch in Urban Design	Pune	Maharashtra	—
Allana College of Architecture	Dr. P.A. Inamdar University	B.Arch	Pune	Maharashtra	—
Allana College of Architecture	Dr. P.A. Inamdar University	M.Arch in Project Management and Entrepreneurship	Pune	Maharashtra	—
Padmashree Dr. D.Y. Patil College of Architecture	Savitribai Phule Pune University	B.Arch	Pune	Maharashtra	—
Padmashree Dr. D.Y. Patil College of Architecture	Savitribai Phule Pune University	M.Arch in Construction Management	Pune	Maharashtra	—
Sinhgad College of Architecture	Savitribai Phule Pune University	B.Arch	Pune	Maharashtra	—
Sinhgad College of Architecture	Savitribai Phule Pune University	M.Arch in Architectural Conservation	Pune	Maharashtra	—
Sinhgad College of Architecture	Savitribai Phule Pune University	M.Arch in Computer Application	Pune	Maharashtra	—
Balwant Sheth School of Architecture	NMIMS University	B.Arch	Mumbai	Maharashtra	—
Balwant Sheth School of Architecture	NMIMS University	M.Arch	Mumbai	Maharashtra	—
Institute of Design Education & Architectural Studies	Rashtrasant Tukadoji Maharaj Nagpur University	B.Arch	Nagpur	Maharashtra	—
Institute of Design Education & Architectural Studies	Rashtrasant Tukadoji Maharaj Nagpur University	M.Arch in Environmental Architecture	Nagpur	Maharashtra	—
Dr. DY Patil School of Architecture	Savitribai Phule Pune University	B.Arch	Pune	Maharashtra	—
Dr. DY Patil School of Architecture	Savitribai Phule Pune University	M.Arch in Environmental Architecture	Pune	Maharashtra	—
Aayojan School of Architecture and Design	Savitribai Phule Pune University	B.Arch	Pune	Maharashtra	—
Aayojan School of Architecture and Design	Savitribai Phule Pune University	M.Arch in Urban Design	Pune	Maharashtra	—
BRICK School of Architecture	Savitribai Phule Pune University	B.Arch	Pune	Maharashtra	—
BRICK School of Architecture	Savitribai Phule Pune University	M.Arch in Design and Project Management	Pune	Maharashtra	—
Aditya College of Architecture	University of Mumbai	B.Arch	Mumbai	Maharashtra	—
Aditya College of Architecture	University of Mumbai	M.Arch in Project Management	Mumbai	Maharashtra	—
D.Y. Patil School of Architecture	D.Y. Patil University	B.Arch	Pune	Maharashtra	—
D.Y. Patil School of Architecture	D.Y. Patil University	M.Arch in Environmental Architecture	Pune	Maharashtra	—
CTES College of Architecture	University of Mumbai	B.Arch	Mumbai	Maharashtra	—
CTES College of Architecture	University of Mumbai	M.Arch in Project Management	Mumbai	Maharashtra	—
Shrimati Kashibai Navale College of Architecture	Savitribai Phule Pune University	B.Arch	Pune	Maharashtra	—
Shrimati Kashibai Navale College of Architecture	Savitribai Phule Pune University	M.Arch in Landscape Architecture	Pune	Maharashtra	—
School of Architecture	MIT Art, Design and Technology University	B.Arch	Pune	Maharashtra	—
School of Architecture	MIT Art, Design and Technology University	M.Arch in Traditional Indian Architectural Knowledge Systems	Pune	Maharashtra	—
Vivekanand Education Society College of Architecture	University of Mumbai	B.Arch	Mumbai	Maharashtra	—
Vivekanand Education Society College of Architecture	University of Mumbai	M.Arch in Landscape Architecture	Mumbai	Maharashtra	—
Vivekanand Education Society College of Architecture	University of Mumbai	M.Arch in Urban Design	Mumbai	Maharashtra	—
Maulana Azad National Institute of Technology	National Institute of Technology	B.Arch	Bhopal	Madhya Pradesh	17
IPS Academy	Rajiv Gandhi Proudyogiki Vishwavidyalaya	B.Arch	Indore	Madhya Pradesh	—
IPS Academy	Rajiv Gandhi Proudyogiki Vishwavidyalaya	M.Arch	Indore	Madhya Pradesh	—
SPA Bhopal	School of Planning and Architecture	B.Arch	Bhopal	Madhya Pradesh	12
Faculty of Architecture	RKDF University	B.Arch	Bhopal	Madhya Pradesh	—
Faculty of Architecture	RKDF University	M.Arch	Bhopal	Madhya Pradesh	—
Piloo Mody College of Architecture	Biju Patnaik University of Technology	B.Arch	Cuttack	Odisha	—
Piloo Mody College of Architecture	Biju Patnaik University of Technology	M.Arch in Habitat Design	Cuttack	Odisha	—
KIIT School of Architecture and Planning	Kalinga Institute of Industrial Technology	B.Arch	Bhubaneswar	Odisha	—
KIIT School of Architecture and Planning	Kalinga Institute of Industrial Technology	M.Arch in Urban Design	Bhubaneswar	Odisha	—
NIT Rourkela	National Institute of Technology	B.Arch	Rourkela	Odisha	9
Chitkara School of Planning and Architecture	Chitkara University	B.Arch	Patiala	Punjab	35
Institute of Engineering and Technology, Bhaddal	I.K. Gujral Punjab Technical University	B.Arch	Ropar	Punjab	—
Institute of Engineering and Technology, Bhaddal	I.K. Gujral Punjab Technical University	M.Arch	Ropar	Punjab	—
Lovely School of Architecture and Design	Lovely Professional University	B.Arch	Phagwara	Punjab	24
Lovely School of Architecture and Design	Lovely Professional University	M.Arch (Executive)	Phagwara	Punjab	24
University Institute of Architecture	Chandigarh University	B.Arch	Mohali	Punjab	13
University Institute of Architecture	Chandigarh University	M.Arch	Mohali	Punjab	13
Malaviya National Institute of Technology	National Institute of Technology	B.Arch	Jaipur	Rajasthan	15
Aayojan School of Architecture	Rajasthan Technical University	B.Arch	Jaipur	Rajasthan	—
Aayojan School of Architecture	Rajasthan Technical University	M.Arch in Architectural Conservation	Jaipur	Rajasthan	—
School of Architecture and Design	Manipal University	B.Arch	Jaipur	Rajasthan	33
School of Architecture and Planning	Anna University	B.Arch	Chennai	Tamil Nadu	34
School of Architecture and Planning	Anna University	M.Plan	Chennai	Tamil Nadu	34
NIT Tiruchirappalli	National Institute of Technology	B.Arch	Tiruchirappalli	Tamil Nadu	8
Adhiyamman College of Engineering	Anna University	B.Arch	Hosur	Tamil Nadu	—
SRM School of Architecture and Interior Design, Kattankullathur	SRM Institute of Science and Technology	B.Arch	Chennai	Tamil Nadu	11
SRM School of Architecture and Interior Design, Kattankullathur	SRM Institute of Science and Technology	M.Arch in Architectural Design	Chennai	Tamil Nadu	11
Bharath School of Architecture	Bharath Institute of Higher Education and Research	B.Arch	Chennai	Tamil Nadu	—
Bharath School of Architecture	Bharath Institute of Higher Education and Research	M.Arch	Chennai	Tamil Nadu	—
Bharath School of Architecture	Bharath Institute of Higher Education and Research	M.Arch in Landscape Architecture	Chennai	Tamil Nadu	—
Hindustan School of Planning, Architecture and Design Excellence	Hindustan Institute of Technology and Science	B.Arch	Chennai	Tamil Nadu	—
Hindustan School of Planning, Architecture and Design Excellence	Hindustan Institute of Technology and Science	M.Arch (Executive)	Chennai	Tamil Nadu	—
Hindustan School of Planning, Architecture and Design Excellence	Hindustan Institute of Technology and Science	M.Arch in Housing	Chennai	Tamil Nadu	—
Hindustan School of Planning, Architecture and Design Excellence	Hindustan Institute of Technology and Science	M.Plan	Chennai	Tamil Nadu	—
Sathyabama School of Building and Environment	Sathyabama Institute of Science and Technology	B.Arch	Chennai	Tamil Nadu	—
Sathyabama School of Building and Environment	Sathyabama Institute of Science and Technology	M.Arch in Building Management	Chennai	Tamil Nadu	—
Sathyabama School of Building and Environment	Sathyabama Institute of Science and Technology	M.Arch in Sustainable Architecture	Chennai	Tamil Nadu	—
Thiagarajar College of Engineering	Anna University	B.Arch	Madurai	Tamil Nadu	25
Periyar Maniammai School of Architecture and Planning	Periyar Maniammai Institute of Science and Technology	B.Arch	Thanjavur	Tamil Nadu	—
Periyar Maniammai School of Architecture and Planning	Periyar Maniammai Institute of Science and Technology	M.Arch	Thanjavur	Tamil Nadu	—
MEASI Academy of Architecture	Anna University	B.Arch	Chennai	Tamil Nadu	—
MEASI Academy of Architecture	Anna University	M.Arch	Chennai	Tamil Nadu	—
MEASI Academy of Architecture	Anna University	M.Arch in Real Estate Development	Chennai	Tamil Nadu	—
McGans Ooty School of Architecture	Anna University	B.Arch	Ooty	Tamil Nadu	—
McGans Ooty School of Architecture	Anna University	M.Arch in Environmental Architecture	Ooty	Tamil Nadu	—
Meenakshi School of Architecture	Anna University	B.Arch	Chennai	Tamil Nadu	—
Meenakshi School of Architecture	Anna University	M.Arch	Chennai	Tamil Nadu	—
Faculty of Architecture	Karpagam Academy of Higher Education	B.Arch	Coimbatore	Tamil Nadu	—
Faculty of Architecture	Karpagam Academy of Higher Education	M.Arch in Advanced Design	Coimbatore	Tamil Nadu	—
Faculty of Architecture	Karpagam Academy of Higher Education	M.Plan in Town and Country Planning	Coimbatore	Tamil Nadu	—
EXCEL College of Architecture and Planning	Anna University	B.Arch	Salem	Tamil Nadu	—
EXCEL College of Architecture and Planning	Anna University	M.Arch	Salem	Tamil Nadu	—
SRM School of Environment, Architecture and Design, Ramapuram	SRM Institute of Science and Technology	B.Arch	Chennai	Tamil Nadu	—
Crescent School of Architecture	B.S. Abdur Rahman Crescent Institute of Science and Technology	B.Arch	Chennai	Tamil Nadu	40
Crescent School of Architecture	B.S. Abdur Rahman Crescent Institute of Science and Technology	M.Arch	Chennai	Tamil Nadu	40
Mohamed Sathak A.J. Academy of Architecture	Anna University	B.Arch	Chennai	Tamil Nadu	—
Mohamed Sathak A.J. Academy of Architecture	Anna University	M.Arch in Architectural Conservation	Chennai	Tamil Nadu	—
MARG Institute of Design and Architecture	Anna University	B.Arch	Chennai	Tamil Nadu	—
MARG Institute of Design and Architecture	Anna University	M.Arch	Chennai	Tamil Nadu	—
Rajalakshmi School of Architecture	Anna University	B.Arch	Chennai	Tamil Nadu	—
Rajalakshmi School of Architecture	Anna University	M.Arch in Urban Design	Chennai	Tamil Nadu	—
Rajalakshmi School of Architecture	Anna University	M.Arch in Digital Architecture	Chennai	Tamil Nadu	—
RVS Padmavathy School of Architecture	Anna University	B.Arch	Tiruvallur	Tamil Nadu	—
RVS Padmavathy School of Architecture	Anna University	M.Arch	Tiruvallur	Tamil Nadu	—
Faculty of Architecture	Dr. M.G.R. Educational and Research Institute University	B.Arch	Chennai	Tamil Nadu	22
Faculty of Architecture	Dr. M.G.R. Educational and Research Institute University	M.Arch in Construction Project Management	Chennai	Tamil Nadu	22
Faculty of Architecture	Dr. M.G.R. Educational and Research Institute University	M.Arch in Landscape Architecture	Chennai	Tamil Nadu	22
Faculty of Architecture	Dr. M.G.R. Educational and Research Institute University	M.Arch in Interior Architecture	Chennai	Tamil Nadu	22
Coimbatore Institute of Engineering and Technology	Anna University	B.Arch	Coimbatore	Tamil Nadu	—
Coimbatore Institute of Engineering and Technology	Anna University	M.Arch in Urban Design	Coimbatore	Tamil Nadu	—
Sigma College of Architecture	Anna University	B.Arch	Kanyakumari	Tamil Nadu	—
Sigma College of Architecture	Anna University	M.Arch	Kanyakumari	Tamil Nadu	—
Kalasalingam School of Architecture	Kalasalingam Academy of Research and Education	B.Arch	Virudhunagar	Tamil Nadu	—
Kalasalingam School of Architecture	Kalasalingam Academy of Research and Education	M.Arch in Habitat Design	Virudhunagar	Tamil Nadu	—
Kongu School of Architecture	Anna University	B.Arch	Erode	Tamil Nadu	—
VIT School of Architecture	Vellore Institute of Technology	B.Arch;	Vellore	Tamil Nadu	—
VIT School of Architecture	Vellore Institute of Technology	M.Arch in Digital Technology in Buildings	Vellore	Tamil Nadu	—
San Academy of Architecture	Anna University	B.Arch	Coimbatore	Tamil Nadu	—
San Academy of Architecture	Anna University	M.Arch	Coimbatore	Tamil Nadu	—
Nehru School of Architecture	Anna University	B.Arch	Coimbatore	Tamil Nadu	—
Saveetha College of Architecture and Design	Saveetha Institute of Medical and Technical Sciences	B.Arch;	Chennai	Tamil Nadu	—
Saveetha College of Architecture and Design	Saveetha Institute of Medical and Technical Sciences	M.Arch in Sustainable Urban Design	Chennai	Tamil Nadu	—
CSI Institute of Technology	Jawaharlal Nehru Architecture and Fine Arts University	B.Arch	Secunderabad	Telangana	—
CSI Institute of Technology	Jawaharlal Nehru Architecture and Fine Arts University	M.Arch in Construction Management	Secunderabad	Telangana	—
CSI Institute of Technology	Jawaharlal Nehru Architecture and Fine Arts University	M.Arch in Interior Design	Secunderabad	Telangana	—
Sri Venkateswara College of Architecture	Jawaharlal Nehru Architecture and Fine Arts University	B.Arch	Hyderabad	Telangana	—
Sri Venkateswara College of Architecture	Jawaharlal Nehru Architecture and Fine Arts University	M.Arch in Interior Design	Hyderabad	Telangana	—
Jawaharlal Nehru Institute of Advanced Studies	Jawaharlal Nehru Architecture and Fine Arts University	B.Arch	Secunderabad	Telangana	—
Jawaharlal Nehru Institute of Advanced Studies	Jawaharlal Nehru Architecture and Fine Arts University	M.Arch in Landscape Architecture	Secunderabad	Telangana	—
Jawaharlal Nehru Institute of Advanced Studies	Jawaharlal Nehru Architecture and Fine Arts University	M.Arch in Construction Management	Secunderabad	Telangana	—
JBR Architecture College	Jawaharlal Nehru Architecture and Fine Arts University	B.Arch	Hyderabad	Telangana	—
JBR Architecture College	Jawaharlal Nehru Architecture and Fine Arts University	M.Arch in Environmental Design	Hyderabad	Telangana	—
JBR Architecture College	Jawaharlal Nehru Architecture and Fine Arts University	M.Arch in Interior Design	Hyderabad	Telangana	—
Aurora Design Academy	Jawaharlal Nehru Architecture and Fine Arts University	B.Arch	Hyderabad	Telangana	—
Aurora Design Academy	Jawaharlal Nehru Architecture and Fine Arts University	M.Arch in Urban Design	Hyderabad	Telangana	—
Aurora Design Academy	Jawaharlal Nehru Architecture and Fine Arts University	M.Arch in Interior Design	Hyderabad	Telangana	—
Ashoka School of Planning and Architecture	Jawaharlal Nehru Architecture and Fine Arts University	B.Arch	Hyderabad	Telangana	—
Ashoka School of Planning and Architecture	Jawaharlal Nehru Architecture and Fine Arts University	M.Arch in Construction Management	Hyderabad	Telangana	—
IIT Roorkee	Indian Institute of Technology	B.Arch	Roorkee	Uttarakhand	1
IIT Roorkee	Indian Institute of Technology	Master of Urban and Rural Planning	Roorkee	Uttarakhand	1
Faculty of Architecture and Planning	Dr. A.P.J. Abdul Kalam Technical University	B.Arch	Lucknow	Uttar Pradesh	—
Faculty of Architecture and Planning	Dr. A.P.J. Abdul Kalam Technical University	M.Arch in Urban Design	Lucknow	Uttar Pradesh	—
Faculty of Architecture and Planning	Dr. A.P.J. Abdul Kalam Technical University	M.Arch in Environmental Architecture	Lucknow	Uttar Pradesh	—
Faculty of Architecture	Aligarh Muslim University	B.Arch	Aligarh	Uttar Pradesh	14
Apeejay Institute of Technology	Dr. A.P.J. Abdul Kalam Technical University	B.Arch	Noida	Uttar Pradesh	—
Apeejay Institute of Technology	Dr. A.P.J. Abdul Kalam Technical University	M.Arch	Noida	Uttar Pradesh	—
Amity School of Architecture and Design	Amity University, Uttar Pradesh	B.Arch	Noida	Uttar Pradesh	—
Amity School of Architecture and Design	Amity University, Uttar Pradesh	M.Arch	Noida	Uttar Pradesh	—
SDGI School of Architecture, Planning and Design	SDGI Global University	B.Arch	Ghaziabad	Uttar Pradesh	—
SDGI School of Architecture, Planning and Design	SDGI Global University	M.Arch	Ghaziabad	Uttar Pradesh	—
IIEST Shibpur	Indian Institute of Engineering Science and Technology	B.Arch	Howrah	West Bengal	4
IIEST Shibpur	Indian Institute of Engineering Science and Technology	M.Plan	Howrah	West Bengal	4
IIT Kharagpur	Indian Institute of Technology	B.Arch	Kharagpur	West Bengal	2
IIT Kharagpur	Indian Institute of Technology	M.Arch in Sustainable Habitat	Kharagpur	West Bengal	2
IIT Kharagpur	Indian Institute of Technology	M.Plan in Regional Planning	Kharagpur	West Bengal	2
IIT Kharagpur	Indian Institute of Technology	M.Plan in City Planning	Kharagpur	West Bengal	2
Jadavpur Faculty of Architecture	Jadavpur University	B.Arch	Kolkata	West Bengal	—
Jadavpur Faculty of Architecture	Jadavpur University	M.Arch in Urban Design	Kolkata	West Bengal	—
Om Dayal School of Architecture	Maulana Abul Kalam Azad University of Technology	B.Arch	Howrah	West Bengal	—
Om Dayal School of Architecture	Maulana Abul Kalam Azad University of Technology	M.Arch in Urban Development	Howrah	West Bengal	—
Techno India School of Architecture	Techno India University	B.Arch	Kolkata	West Bengal	—
Techno India School of Architecture	Techno India University	M.Arch	Kolkata	West Bengal	—
Amity School of Architecture and Planning	Amity University, Kolkata	B.Arch	Kolkata	West Bengal	25
