= Professional requirements for architects =

Professional requirements for architects vary from place to place, but usually consist of three elements: a university degree or advanced education, a period of internship or training in an office, and examination for registration with a jurisdiction.

Professionals engaged in the design and supervision of construction projects prior to the late 19th century were not necessarily trained in a separate architecture program in an academic setting. Instead, they usually carried the title of Master Builder, or surveyor, after serving a number of years as an apprentice (such as Sir Christopher Wren). The formal study of architecture in academic institutions played a pivotal role in the development of the profession as a whole, serving as a focal point for advances in architectural technology and theory.

== Professional requirements by country ==
=== Algeria ===
To be registered as a practicing architect in Algeria, you need to study for 5 years and complete a mandatory 1.5 years of professional experience (stage) an architect must meet the following requirements:

- Completed 3 years of university education B.Arch.
- Completed a further two years of university education (M. Arch) or (Master's degree) in Architecture, (the M. Arch solely doesn't allow to hold or use the "Architect Title" in Algeria)
- Alternatively to the two points above, you can study for a continuous five years in architecture.
- complete a one-year and a half of professional experience under a qualified architect (the architect has to have had been qualified for at least five years prior)
- being registered to the Conseil National de l'Ordre des Architectes CNOA, المجلس الوطني لنقابة المهندسين المعماريين, the Algerian institution that protects the architect title and regulates the profession.
- Must attend a ceremony at the end of the professional experience
- pay yearly contribution to stay on the architects register.

=== Australia ===
In Australia, the title of architect is legally limited to those registered through state and territory Architects Registration Boards. There are three basic requirements for registration: a professional degree from an accredited school of architecture at Masters level or equivalent; at least two years of practical experience; and the completion of the three stage Architectural Practice Examination (practical experience, written exam and interview).

Australia has a federal system of government and regulation of most professions occurs at the state and territory level. The architecture profession is regulated by eight State and Territory Architect Registration Boards, with each jurisdiction having its own Architects Act (Act) and Architects Regulations (Regulations). Regulations are delegated legislation, usually made by a Minister under the Act to clarify or expand on particular aspects of regulation. The eight Architect Registration Boards are collectively the owners of the national standard setting body, the Architects Accreditation Council of Australia (AACA).

Architects may be members of the Australian Institute of Architects (formerly the Royal Australian Institute of Architects), which is the professional organization. Members use the post-nominal letters RAIA.

All states and territories have legislation to govern the use of the title architect and make it an offence for anyone other than a registered architect to use the title. As exact requirements can vary, it is essential to check the relevant legislation in each State.

=== Canada ===
In Canada, architects are required to meet three common requirements for registration: education, experience, and examination. Educational requirements generally consist of an M.Arch. degree and are certified by the Canadian Architectural Certification Board (CACB). For degreed candidates, the experience requirement is typically the Intern Architect Program (IAP). The provincial associations of architects, by the authority granted under their respective provincial Architects Act, require that Interns gain a minimum of 5,600 hours of work experience. The fundamental purpose of the pre-registration/licensing employment period is to ensure that the Intern is provided with sufficient experience to meet the standards of practical skill and level of competence required to engage in the practice of architecture. This experience is diversified into four main categories and 16 sub-categories, and must be completed working under the direct supervision of a registered architect. At present, all jurisdictions use the Architect Registration Examination (ARE), a series of seven computerized exams administered by the National Council of Architectural Registration Boards (NCARB). As well, all jurisdictions recognize the Examination for Architects in Canada (ExAC), administered by the Pan Canadian ExAC Committee. Upon completion of the educational requirements, IAP, and examinations, one can apply for registration/license with their respective provincial architectural institute. Architects must pay an annual fee and meet continuing education requirements to maintain their license to practice.

The Royal Architectural Institute of Canada (RAIC) was established in 1907 and is a voluntary national association representing more than 3,600 architects and Faculty and graduates of accredited Canadian Schools of Architecture. The RAIC aims to be "the voice of Architecture and its practice in Canada". Members are permitted to use the suffix MRAIC after their names. The suffix FRAIC (Fellow of the RAIC) is used by members of the RAIC College of Fellows. Not all members of the RAIC hold accredited degrees in architecture, and not all Canadian architects are members of the RAIC.

=== European Union ===
Directive 2005/36/EC sets the professional requirements for architects in the EU.

==== Austria ====
Austria's nationally-based seat requirements for architects and engineers were criticised by the European Commission in 2016, as the Commission believed the requirements were not consistent with the EU's Services Directive of 2006.

==== France ====
===== Professional requirements =====
To practice as a project manager (maître d'oeuvre in French), an architect must meet the following requirements :

- hold a M.Arch or Master's degree in Architecture, (the M.Arch solely doesn't allow to hold the "Architect Title" in France)
- hold the "Capacitation for project management in its own name" certificate (HMONP, Habilitation à la Maîtrise d'Oeuvre en Nom Propre, in French)
- being registered to the National Architects Order Board, the French institution that protects the architect title and profession.
- have a Professional Liability insurance coverage

===== Legal references and background =====
In France the profession is defined and regulated by the 1977 Law, which defines architecture as follows:

Architecture is an expression of culture. Architectural design, quality of buildings, their harmonious incorporation into their surroundings, respect for natural and urban landscapes and architectural heritage are of public interest. The authorities responsible for issuing building permits and authorizations to subdivide ensure, during the processing of applications, compliance with this interest.

This law, amongst others, sets the educational requirements to practice as an architect, and the rules under which exercise of the profession of architecture, in Titles III and IV.

According to the 1977 law, "Anyone wishing to undertake a construction subject to an application for a building permit, shall resort to an architect in order to establish the architectural project," But the "Code for Urbanism" sets the actual conditions and limits of mandatory resorting to the architect. Contracting with an architect is mandatory solely if the construction project is in excess of 150 sqm flooring surface /or footprint on the parcel (this threshold rise up to 800 sqm for any farming building).

Architecture in France fully depends on the Culture Department of the French government, so does The National Superior Schools of Architecture, and the National Architects Order Board.

===== Education =====
Education is provided by one of the 20 ENSA (National Superior School of Architecture) schools spread across the French territory, which are public schools. Tuition fees rise around 700 euros per year. See Etudes d'Architecture en France(in French).

==== Germany ====
In Germany, the title of architect is legally limited to those registered with a provincial Chamber of Architects (Architektenkammer http://www.architektenkammern.net/). Admission to a German chamber of architects is required for someone to be a professional architect. The chambers also register interior designers, landscape architects, and urban planners.(http://www.architekten-thueringen.de/english/)

There are three general requirements for registration, which vary from chamber to chamber: successful completion of a four-year architectural program, continuing professional education, and several years of practical experience under a registered architect. The registration with a chamber of architects is based on either place of residence of the architect or their workplace.

All provincial Chambers of Architects are members of the Federal Chamber of Architects (BAK - Bundesarchitektenkammer) located in Berlin. The federal chamber does not provide professional registration.

==== Ireland ====
The main body for Architecture in Ireland is the Royal Institute of Architects in Ireland, RIAI. Members may use the affix MRIAI and are registered to use the title "Architect" in company stationery. The title has only recently been protected.

To become a registered Architect, it usually takes five years' full-time study in the recognised schools of Architecture, followed by a minimum of two years approved experience, and one of the recognised Professional Practice qualifications to gain admission to the RIAI . In all, it takes a minimum of seven years to gain registration. More details can be found on the RIAI website.

An alternate route to the Register is available through the ARAE (Architects Register Admission Examination) - this provides an opportunity for those without the required educational and professional qualifications to enter the Register in Ireland. This examination has operated successfully since 2009.

==== Italy ====
To enter the profession in Italy, individuals are required to first obtain a degree in architecture, or a degree in Building Engineering/ Architecture, then to receive professional qualification, obtained by passing a state exam with four tests (three written and one oral). To practice, the architect must register with the Ordine degli architetti (Order of Architects), which following a recent reform also includes planners, landscape architects and conservationists (architectural heritage). The Orders are organised by province, and registration is based on place of residence of the architect. Within the order there are currently several classes and categories, depending on specific qualifications.

Italian law recognises equal rights to Building engineers registered with the appropriate order. Other professionals in the construction industry are the geometra (surveyor) and the perito industriale (technical expert) specialising in construction; these professionals have several limitations compared to architects and engineers, as they follow a different and shorter course of study aimed at learning basic and complementary aspects of work in construction.

=== India ===
The Architects Act of 1972 regulates the practice of Architects in India. Under this act, the Indian Ministry of Education constituted Council of Architecture as a statutory body responsible for regulation of architectural education and practice of Architects throughout India. To practice as an Architect in India, individuals are required to register with Council of Architecture as an architect.

According to the Architects Act of 1972, individuals wishing to register as an architect are required to complete a 5-year long Bachelor of Architecture (B.Arch) programme from an educational institution approved by the Council of Architecture. For this purpose, the Council of Architecture maintains a list of educational institution providing B.Arch programmes meeting the minimum required standards of architectural education in India.

Additionally, the Architects Act of 1972 recognises Associate Membership of the Indian Institute of Architects as equivalent to B.Arch degree, qualifying associate members to register as an architect. The Indian Institute of Architects offers associate membership through examination for individuals possessing 5 years of work experience under the supervision of an employer, who is an architect registered with Council of Architecture and is a member of Indian Institute of Architects. The required working experience is relaxed for individuals possessing a 3-year long diploma in Architectural Assistantship, Interior Design and Civil Engineering.

=== Mexico ===
In Mexico, every profession is regulated by the Secretariat of Public Education, including architecture. The Secretariat expedes a Professional License (in Spanish cédula profesional), only after a recognized undergraduate degree is successfully achieved. Therefore, it is legally sufficient for an architect to hold an undergraduate diploma and a Professional License to practice. Registration to an official college or association of architects is completely optional.

Nevertheless, other norms regulate the building industry. In Mexico, it is common for constructions to be developed by individuals other than architects, these regulations are quite unrelated to the architecture profession. For a major construction, it is necessary for a professional to act as a Director Responsible of Construction (in Spanish, Director Responsable de Obra or DRO). This position does require a minimum of two years of professional experience in construction, as well as further evaluation and/or training. However, it is uncommon for architects to assume this role; this is generally a position preferred by and reserved to civil engineers.

=== Nigeria ===
In Nigeria, the use of the title "Architect" in connection with architectural building plans or any business related to architecture is legally restricted under Section 1 of the Architects (Registration, Etc.) Act, to architects who are fully registered by the Architects Registration Council of Nigeria (ARCON), the regulatory body overseeing the architectural profession in the country. It usually takes a minimum of nine years to obtain the necessary qualifications and experience for registration.

To be registered as an architect, individuals must fulfill several requirements set by ARCON. Prospective architects typically undergo a minimum of four years of university education in architecture, culminating in a Bachelor of Architecture (B.Arch) degree. Following this, they may pursue further studies at the master's level, obtaining a Master of Architecture (M.Arch) degree and also enrol for National Youth Service Corps. The completion of these academic programmes is a prerequisite for professional registration.

Upon completing their formal education, aspiring architects are required to undergo a period of practical training, often referred to as the "professional experience" stage. This stage typically lasts for a minimum of two years and involves working under the supervision of a registered architect. During this period, individuals gain hands-on experience in various aspects of architectural practice, preparing them for independent professional work.

After this, individuals can then apply to ARCON for the Professional Practice Competence Examinations which is in three stages: practical experience, written exams and interview. These examinations assess candidates' competence in areas such as architectural design, construction technology, professional practice, and ethics.

Architects in Nigeria may choose to join professional organisations such as the Nigerian Institute of Architects (NIA) and the Association of Nigerian Chartered Architects (ANCA). These organisations provide networking opportunities, support professional development, and advocate for the interests of architects within the country.

=== Singapore ===
In Singapore, university study is required (such as the five-year course of study at the National University of Singapore or certain approved foreign universities). Upon completion of university, additional training by working for a minimum of two years under a registered architect is required to become registered. Singaporean law governs the use of the term "architect" and prescribes the requirements to be listed in the Register of Architects. Membership in the Singapore Institute of Architects is a voluntary professional credential.

=== South Africa ===
In South Africa, Architecture can be practiced in one of four categories, depending on qualification: professional architect (Pr.Arch.), professional senior architectural technologist (Pr.S.Arch.T.), professional technologist (Pr.Arch.T.), or professional draughtsperson (Pr.Arch.Draught.). The possibility of progression from one category to the next has been provided for in the Regulations, and is under review.

When studied through a university, the programme is structured in two parts: the first is a three-year course leading to a Bachelor of Architectural Studies or BSc (Architecture). The second is an additional two-year postgraduate, professional degree—either the Bachelor of Architecture or Master of Architecture, depending on University—which qualifies an individual to become an architect. A student can exit university after obtaining the first degree, and can become a senior architectural technologist. When studied through a University of Technology (or a comprehensive university), the courses in architecture are a three-year National Diploma, and, after an additional year of study, the B.Tech degree. These enable a student to become an architectural technologist or senior technologist, respectively. To become a draughtsperson, one requires a (two year) National Certificate.

After graduating, one enters a two-year period of in service training as a "candidate", and sits a Professional Practice entrance examination; one must also register with the South African Council for the Architectural Profession. Qualified architects can become members of the South African Institute of Architects.

=== Sri Lanka ===
Term "Architect" and "Chartered Architect" are protected titles in Sri Lanka under the Sri Lanka Institute of Architects law (act) no. 1 of 1976 and the Sri Lanka Institute of Architects (Amendment) Act, No. 14 of 1996.

In Sri Lanka, architects are required to meet three common requirements for registration: education, experience, and examination. The Education can be from one of the two available institutions; the degree course held by University of Moratuwa or by the part-time course held by the City School of Architecture (owned by the Sri Lanka institute of Architects) or by any foreign university recognized by the SLIA.

The University of Moratuwa has been offering a "3+2" program recognized by both the SLIA and RIBA; a three-year B.Sc. (Built Environment) degree and a two-year masters, M.Sc. (Architecture). This with the two years of appropriate work experience and successful completion of SLIA Part III examination would lead to the charter and the Architectural Registration Board (ARB) registration.

Recently, the University of Moratuwa has changed the "3+2" program to a continuous five-year B.Arch. program.

City School of Architecture offers a part-time course of seven years during which the students should be working continuously under the supervision of a Chartered Architect while attending the school on a part-time basis. Completion of the first four years of this program qualifies for SLIA part I and completion of the balance after three years qualifies for SLIA part II. Successful completion of this program with the 1 year of appropriate work experience and successful completion of SLIA Part III examination would lead to the charter and the Architectural Registration Board (ARB) registration.

=== United Kingdom ===
In the United Kingdom, practicing under the name, style or title "architect" is restricted by law to those registered at the Architects Registration Board. It usually takes a minimum of seven years to obtain the necessary qualifications and experience for registration. Those wishing to become registered must first study at a recognised university-level school of architecture. Though there are some variations from university to university, the basic principle is that to qualify as an architect, a candidate must pass through three stages administered by the Royal Institute of British Architects:

- On completing an initial degree in architecture (usually three or four years, usually either a BA, BSc, or BArch) the candidate receives exemption from RIBA Part I. There then follows a period of a minimum of one year, which the candidate spends in an architect's office gaining work experience.
- The candidate must then complete a post-graduate university course, usually two years, to receive either a graduate diploma (Dip Arch), Masters (MArch) or B(Arch). On completing that course, the candidate receives exemption from Part II of the RIBA process.
- The candidate must then spend a further period of at least one year gaining experience before being allowed to take the RIBA Part III examination in Professional Practice and Management which follows a year long course (part time evenings) with several written exam papers, a building study, a completed CPD record and an oral exam.

=== United States ===
In the United States, people wishing to become licensed architects are required to meet the requirements of their respective state, or jurisdiction. While each jurisdiction is responsible for regulating the practice of architecture within its borders, the National Council of Architectural Registration Boards (NCARB) develops and administers national programs for candidates pursuing architectural licensure. Created in 1919, NCARB is a nonprofit organization made up of the architectural licensing boards of the 50 U.S. states, as well as the District of Columbia, Guam, the Northern Mariana Islands, Puerto Rico, and the U.S. Virgin Islands. The organization also helps architects expand their professional reach through the NCARB Certificate—a credential that facilitates licensure across borders, provides access to free continuing education, and more.

Requirements vary among jurisdictions, but there are three core requirements for registration: education, experience, and examination. Most jurisdictions require a professional degree from a program accredited by the National Architectural Accrediting Board (NAAB) to satisfy their education requirement. This could be either a B.Arch., M.Arch., or D.Arch. degree. The experience requirement for licensure candidates is met by completing the Architectural Experience Program (AXP), a national program split into six specified areas that mirror the phases of a typical architecture project (Practice Management, Project Management, Programming & Analysis, Project Planning & Design, Project Development & Documentation, and Construction & Evaluation) and identify key skills candidates will need to practice as working architects. A minimum total of 3,740 hours must be earned under direct supervision from a licensed architect to meet most jurisdiction's experience requirement. All jurisdictions use the Architect Registration Examination (ARE), a series of six exams administered by NCARB that evaluate whether candidates have the necessary knowledge and skills in areas of architecture related to health, safety, and welfare. All architects licensed by their respective states have professional status as Registered Architects (RA).

Depending on the policies of the registration board for the jurisdiction in question, it is sometimes possible to become a licensed architect in other ways like reciprocal licensure for international architects and working under an architect as an intern for an extended period of time. The length of the typical licensure process depends on the particular combination of education, experience and pace of examination of a candidate. According to the 2020 NCARB by the Numbers, the average licensure candidate who completed their final core requirement for licensure in 2019—including education, experience, and examination—took 12.7 years.
