= Architectural education in India =

Architectural education in India includes educational activities involved in the education and training of architects in the country. A typical outline of the architectural education pathway is presented below.

== Overview ==
The architectural education in India includes educational activities involved in the education and training of architects in India. It is regulated by the Council of Architecture.

=== Pathway ===
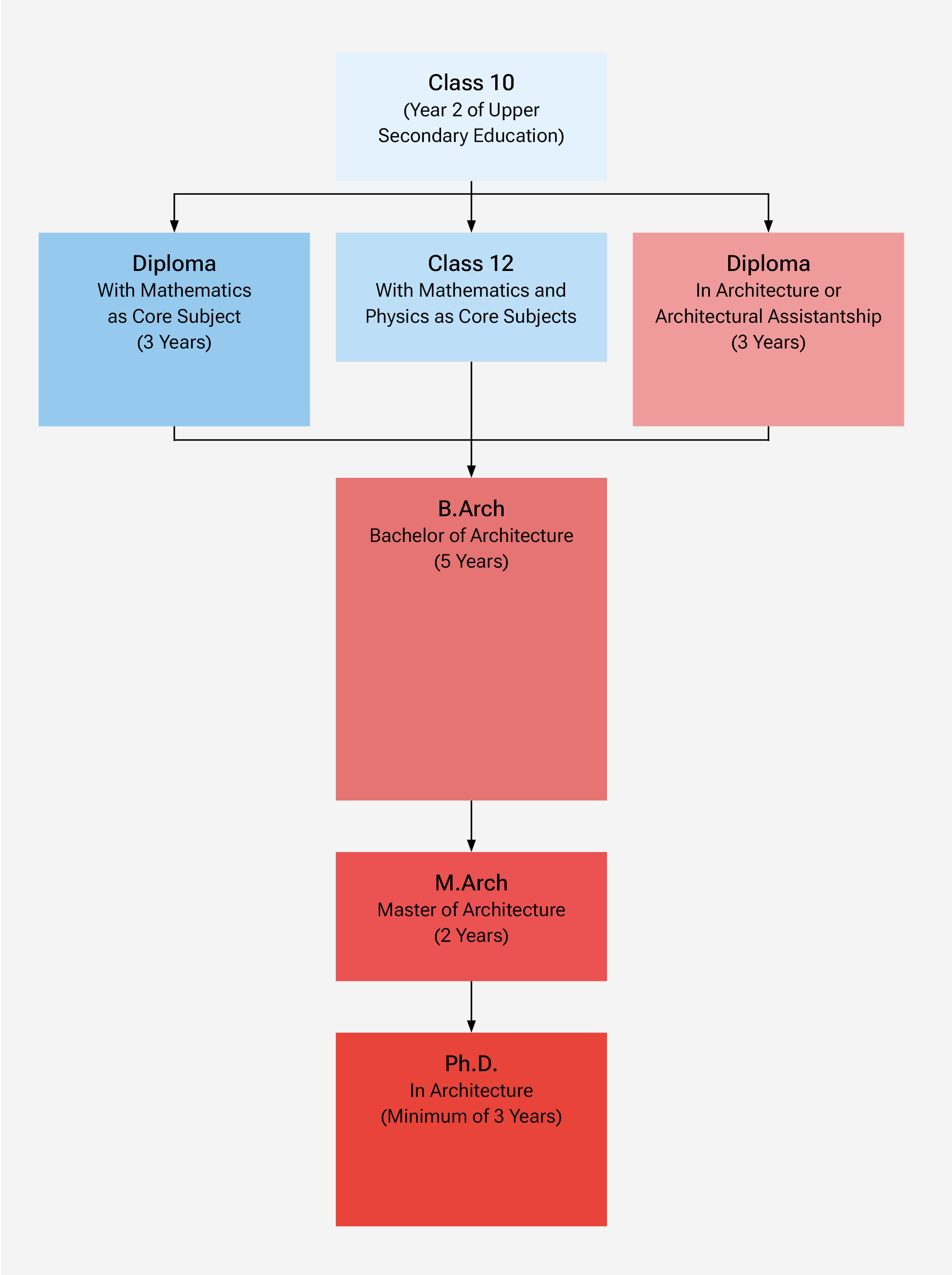
Outline of architectural education in India

The following provides typical outline of architectural education in India:

- Diploma in Architecture or Architectural Assistantship is a 3-year long diploma (ISCED level 4) programme. Candidates are required to have completed the second year of Upper Secondary Education (Class 10). Graduates are eligible for admission to undergraduate programmes.
- Bachelor of Architecture (B.Arch) is a 5-year long undergraduate professional (ISCED level 6) programme. Candidates are required to have completed the 12th grade of school (ISCED level 3) or diploma (ISCED level 4) with mathematics as core course. Additionally, candidates are required to pass the admission test National Aptitude Test in Architecture (NATA). Graduates are eligible to register as an architect and for admission to postgraduate programmes. Additionally, graduates with ten years experience in teaching, research and professional practice are eligible for admission to doctoral programmes in architecture.
- Master of Architecture (M.Arch) is a 2-year long postgraduate (ISCED level 7) programme. Candidates are required to have completed Bachelor of Architecture (B.Arch) or equivalent recognised by the Council of Architecture. Additionally, candidates are required to pass the admission test Postgraduate Entrance Test in Architecture (PGETA). Graduates are eligible for admission to doctoral programmes in architecture.
- Doctor of Philosophy (PhD) in Architecture is a terminal degree (ISCED level 8) programme. Candidates are required to have completed Master of Architecture (M.Arch) or postgraduate degree in allied fields. Additionally, Bachelor of Architecture (B.Arch) graduates with ten years experience in teaching, research and professional practice are eligible for admission.

=== Regulatory body ===
The Council of Architecture is a statutory body constituted by the Indian Ministry of Education under the Architects Act of 1972. It is responsible for regulation of architectural education and practice of architecture throughout India. It approves higher education institutions in India to provide a 5-year long Bachelor of Architecture (B.Arch) and a 2-year long Master of Architecture (M.Arch) degrees.

== Bachelor of Architecture ==
The Bachelor of Architecture (B.Arch) is an undergraduate degree classified as ISCED level 6. It is also a professional degree that fulfils the academic requirements for registration as an architect with the Council of Architecture. The Council of Architecture maintains a list of approved architecture schools that offer this degree.

=== Structure ===
The B.Arch programme lasts 5 years and is divided into 10 semesters, each consisting of 90 working days. During their 8th or 9th semester, students undergo 80 days of practical training. In the 10th semester, students complete an Architectural Thesis, where they demonstrate their ability to conceive an architectural design of built environment.

== See also ==
- Architecture of India
