= Thomas Leslie (architect) =

American architect (born 1967)

Thomas Leslie (born 1967) is an American architect and the Ralph E. Johnson Professor of Design at the Illinois School of Architecture at the University of Illinois Urbana-Champaign.

Leslie earned a Bachelor of Architectural Studies from the University of Illinois at Urbana–Champaign in 1989, followed by a Master of Architecture at Columbia University in 1992. He worked for Foster & Partners for seven years, and taught at Iowa State University from 2000-2022. Leslie was a 2004 awardee of Association of Collegiate Schools of Architecture's Creative Achievement Award. He was named to the Pickard Chilton Professorship in Architecture within the Iowa State University College of Design in 2011. In 2013, Leslie was awarded the Booth Family Rome Prize in Historic Preservation and Conservation. Leslie received the 2015 Educator Award from the Iowa chapter of the American Institute of Architects. The following year, Leslie was appointed to a Morrill Professorship at Iowa State University. In 2018, Leslie was elected a fellow of the American Institute of Architects. He joined the faculty of the University of Illinois in 2022, and was named an ACSA Distinguished Professor in 2023.

Leslie is the author of several books on Construction History, notably Chicago Skyscrapers, 1871-1934 (2013), and Chicago Skyscrapers, 1934-1986 (2023), which received the 2024 Newberry Library Pattis Family Foundation Book award for a work that "transforms public understanding of Chicago, its history, and its people."

== Selected publications ==
- Leslie, Thomas (2023). Chicago Skyscrapers, 1934-1986.. University of Illinois Press. ISBN 978-0-252-04495-3.
- Leslie, Thomas (2017). Beauty's Rigor: Patterns of Production in the Work of Pier Luigi Nervi. University of Illinois Press. ISBN 9780252041129.
- Leslie, Thomas (2013). Chicago Skyscrapers, 1871-1934. University of Illinois Press. ISBN 9780252094798. JSTOR 10.5406/j.ctt2tt9vr. Alternate URL
- Leslie, Thomas (2007). Iowa State Fair: Country Comes to Town. Princeton Architectural Press. ISBN 9781568985688.
- Leslie, Thomas (2005). Louis I. Kahn: Building Art, Building Science. George Braziller Inc. ISBN 9780807615409.
