= Architect Africa Film Festival =

The Architect Africa Film Festival (AAFF) is a bi-annual architectural event held in South Africa by the Architects Collective of South Africa. For the duration of three weeks, the Architect Africa Film Festival travels to Johannesburg, Durban, Cape Town, Bloemfontein and Port Elizabeth where up to 25 international and local films featuring the built environment are screened to the public at central cinema complexes. This becomes the core event around which many additional activities take place, including two student competitions – the Tripod Architecture Photography Competition and the Moving Spaces Film Competition.

== Films ==
The Architect Africa Film Festival screens films about built environments or urban landscapes or anything to do with modern city life. The films vary in length from short films to feature length. The films can be documentaries or fictional narratives. All of the films have something to say about cities and architecture and are sourced from all over the world.

Some of the films screened at previous festivals include: The Fountainhead, Metropolis, City of God, The Belly of an Architect, The 11th Hour, My Architect, The Garden, and Marina of the Zabbaleen. Many of the films are award-winning and inspire the many people who attend the festival.

== Collaborative origin ==
In 2006 the AAC formulated a plan for the creation of a registered integral collective which would be representative and controlled by the Architectural Profession in South Africa and charged with the organisational and administrative functions required to host a premier national event.

A formal non-profit organisation was registered in 2007 under the name of Architects Collective of South Africa (Reg.No. 2007/007763/08). The first Festival with associated exhibitions was held in September 2007 in Johannesburg, Cape Town and Durban.

From the outset the Festival received the committed support of the South African Council for the Architectural Profession, the South African Institute of Architects and a number of architectural practices and organisations. This has ensured its success and growth. The Architect Africa Film Festival is held over three weeks in Johannesburg, Durban, Cape Town, Bloemfontein and Port Elizabeth, usually between the months of September and October.

== History ==
The first Architect Africa Film Festival (2007) was held, and acclaimed, in South Africa's three major centres in August and September 2007. The success of the first Festival, and the generous support of sponsors, enabled the Festival 2008 to take place in five cities – Johannesburg, Durban, Cape Town, Bloemfontein and Port Elizabeth – making it a truly national event.

In September 2009, the Architects’ Collective was invited to host Architect Africa Film Screenings at the Architecture Student Congress/African Perspectives Conference at the University of Pretoria. The event was used to launch the winning films from the Moving Spaces Student Film Competition.

As a result of this collaboration, the Collective was approached to host smaller events on behalf of the regional institutes of architecture. In October 2009, Architect Africa Film Screenings were held at the 50th Anniversary Celebration of the John Moffat building, School of Architecture & Planning, at the University of the Witwatersrand.

2010 saw the Architects' Collective host their third and biggest film festival yet. Screenings were hosted again in the five major cities and included the first major public screenings of the Moving Space student films from 2009 and 2010. Alongside the film screenings the best photographs from the Tripod Photography competition were exhibited.

In addition, during the Johannesburg leg the Architects' Collective hosted a special screening at the Bus Factory as part of the AZA2010 festival. The Architects’ Collective continues to grow its recognition as a major player in the architecture and film festival communities.
