= Basic education =

Primary and lower secondary education

According to the International Standard Classification of Education (ISCED), basic education comprises the two stages primary education and lower secondary education.

== Universal basic education ==
Basic education featured heavily in the 1997 ISCED document, but the term was not included in the glossary. Each country interpreted the term in different ways, and leading up to the 2011 revision, a discussion paper was issued to seek clarification.

In most countries, ISCED 1 corresponds to the nationally designated primary education, and basic education includes that and also ISCED 2 lower secondary education (the lower level of secondary school). In other countries, where there is no break between primary and lower secondary education, "basic education" covers the entire compulsory school period. For statistical reasons, ISCED 1 is then considered to be the first six years of schooling.

Universal basic education is regarded as a priority for developing countries and is the focus of the Education For All movement led by UNESCO. It is also included in the Millennium Development Goals as goal number 2: achieve universal primary education by 2015.

An extensive number of studies have proven its benefits for public health (e.g. lower spread of HIV/AIDS; better vaccination; prevention and medication of disease; better nutrition; lower maternal, infant, and child mortality), demography (e.g. longer life expectancy, accelerated demographic transition through better birth control) and the economy (e.g. increased purchase power, increased productivity in traditional sectors, increased demand on service sectors). Other benefits, although more difficult to measure, include a beneficial impact on democracy, human rights, governance, and political stability through increased understanding of non-violent ways to solve problems and mutual understanding between groups in conflict.

The Convention on the Rights of the Child (CRC), established by UNICEF in 1989, protects children's inalienable rights by setting standards for multiple issues, one of which is education.

== Gender equality in basic education ==
Gender equality in education has traditionally been narrowly equated with gender parity at different levels of formal education. Gender has been a traditional factor of inequality and disparity in education, most often to the disadvantage of girls and women. Yet there has been significant progress in narrowing the gap around the world since 2000, with a larger proportion of girls and women accessing different levels of formal education. Indeed, gender parity in primary education has been achieved in Central Europe, Eastern Europe, Central Asia, East Asia and the Pacific, Latin America and the Caribbean, North America and Western Europe. In addition, significant progress has been made since 2000 in narrowing the gender gap, particularly in South and West Asia and to a lesser degree in sub-Saharan Africa and the Arab States. However, despite the significant progress made, the majority of out-of-school children are girls, while two-thirds of youth and adults with low levels of literacy in the world are women. To help ensure women's empowerment, boys and men must also be engaged in the fight against gender inequality. This must begin with basic education.

== See also ==
- International Standard Classification of Education
- K–12
- Educational stage
- Primary education
- Secondary education

== Sources ==
This article incorporates text from a free content work. Licensed under CC-BY-SA IGO 3.0 (license statement/permission). Text taken from Rethinking Education: Towards a global common good?, 44, UNESCO. UNESCO.
