= UNESCO nomenclature =

Classification system

UNESCO Nomenclature (more properly UNESCO nomenclature for fields of science and technology) is a system developed by UNESCO for classification of research papers and doctoral dissertations. There are three versions of the system, offering different levels of refinement through 2-, 4-, and 6-digit codes.

== Two-digit system ==
11 Logic
12 Mathematics
21 Astronomy, Astrophysics
22 Physics
23 Chemistry
24 Life Sciences
25 Earth and space science
31 Agricultural Sciences
32 Medical Sciences
33 Technological Sciences
51 Anthropology
52 Demography
53 Economic Sciences
54 Geography
55 History
56 Juridical Science and Law
57 Linguistics
58 Pedagogy
59 Political Science
61 Psychology
62 Sciences of Arts and Letters
63 Sociology
71 Ethics
72 Philosophy

== See also ==
- UNESCO Standard Classification of Education
