= South African Council for the Architectural Profession =

South African professional organization

The South African Council for the Architectural Profession (SACAP) is a professional organisation for the architectural community in South Africa. It was established

"To guide, facilitate and promote a high standard of competency and responsibility in the architectural profession and to increase public awareness of the range of architectural services offered. To ensure the profession fulfils its total role in the development of South Africa."

Its aim is to maintain the standard of education given to architects at technikons and universities through the granting of professional certification. These functions were taken over from the South African Council for Architects in 2001 due to the Architectural Profession Act 2000, Act 44 of 2000.

== See also ==
- Professional requirements for architects# South Africa
- List of architecture schools in South Africa
- South African Institute of Architects
