= Annapurna College of Film and Media =

Annapurna College of Film and Media (ACFM)
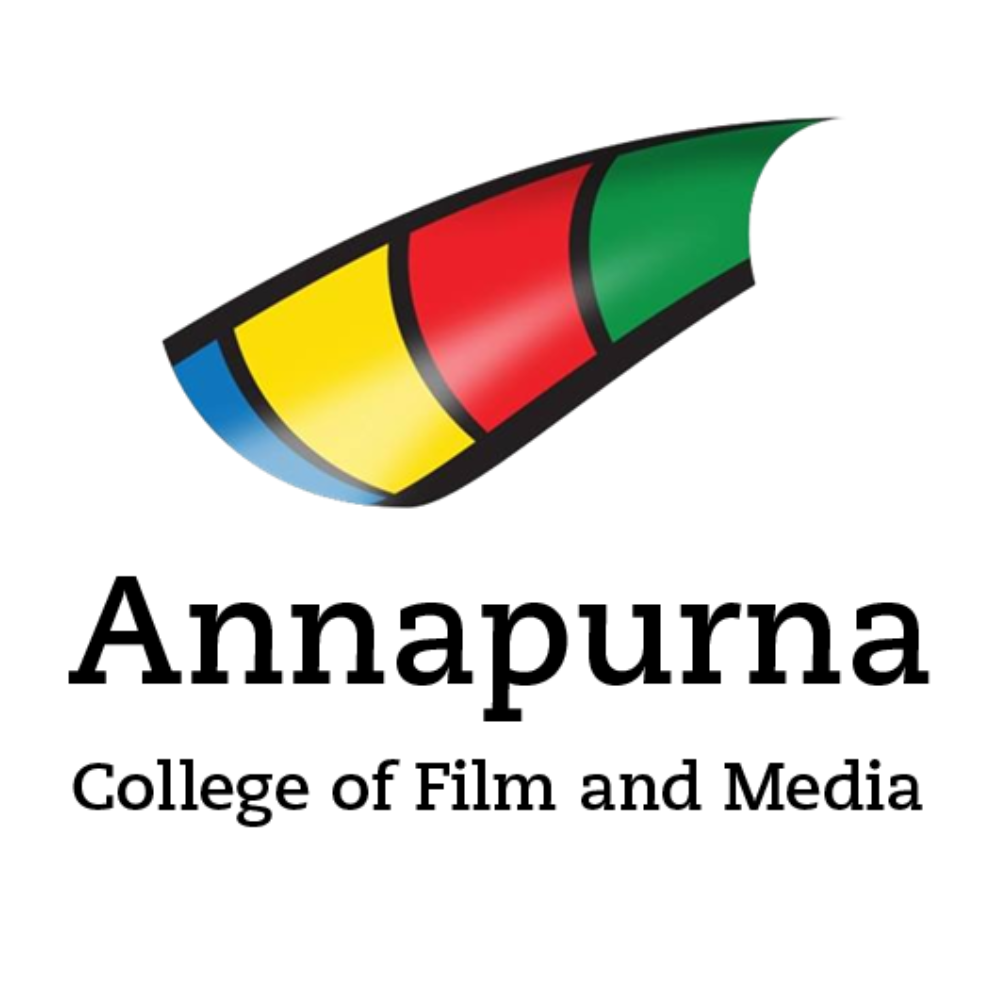
- Hyderabad, Telangana; India

Information
- Former names: International School of Film and Media (ISFM) (2011–2014); Annapurna International School of Film and Media (AISFM) (2014–2020)
- Type: Private film school and acting school
- Established: 30 June 2011
- Founder: Nagarjuna & Akkineni Nageswara Rao
- Campus: Annapurna Studios
- Affiliations: JNAFAU
- Website: www.acfm.edu.in

Annapurna College of Film and Media is a Film School based in Hyderabad, India. It's India's first private, non-profit media school. The institute was founded by the Akkineni family, including Nagarjuna and Akkineni Nageswara Rao.

Amala Akkineni is presently the Director of Annapurna College of Film and Media.

ACFM offers courses in acting, direction, cinematography, Sound Design, editing, screenwriting and producing.

== Campus ==
ACFM is on the grounds of an Annapurna Studio. Spread across 22 Acres, Annapurna Studios showcases itself as a technically advanced and integrated film & media hub.

== Academics ==
On 20 June 2012, Annapurna College of Film and Media (AISFM) has signed a memorandum of understanding with Jawaharlal Nehru Architecture and Fine Arts University, to provide India's first government-recognized, full-time degree courses in filmmaking. The MoU is for a period of four years.

== Acting Course ==
ACFM holds two six-month acting courses every year.

== International collaborations ==
Northwestern University

Annapurna College of Film and Media (ACFM) and Northwestern University's School of Communication recently completed the first Indian Cinema Seminar - a student and cultural exchange program conducted in Hyderabad, India. As part of this activity, 27 students and faculty from the Northwestern University's School of Communication campuses at Evanston (USA) and Doha (Qatar) spent a week at ACFM in Hyderabad. The seminar began with site visits to important radio and TV stations and film production studios, and completed with a 48-hour film making challenge. Five films were made collaboratively by Northwestern and AISFM students.

== See also ==
- Film and Television Institute of India
- Whistling Woods International Institute
- State Institute of Film and Television
