= B. S. Abdur Rahman Crescent Institute of Science and Technology =

Private university in Chennai, Tamil Nadu, India

B.S. Abdur Rahman Crescent Institute of Science and Technology
- Former names: B.S. Abdur Rahman Crescent Engineering College (1984–2008); B.S. Abdur Rahman Crescent University (2008–2017)
- Type: Deemed University
- Established: November 5, 1984; 41 years ago
- Founder: B. S. Abdur Rahman
- Accreditation: NAAC; NBA
- Affiliations: UGC; AIU; ACU
- Academic affiliations: AICTE; BCI; COA; IIA; PCI
- Chancellor: Qurrath Jameela
- Vice-Chancellor: T. Murugesan
- Academic staff: 295 (2020)
- Students: 9,239 (2024)
- Undergraduates: 7,556 (2024)
- Postgraduates: 1,240 (2024)
- Doctoral students: 443 (2024)
- Location: Vandalur, Tamil Nadu, India; 12°52′39″N 80°5′5″E
- Campus: Suburban Campus, 50 acres (20 ha)
- Website: crescent.education

B.S. Abdur Rahman Crescent Institute of Science and Technology is a private deemed university located in Tamil Nadu, India. Founded in 1984, Crescent was one of the first self-financing engineering institutions in the Indian State of Tamil Nadu. After being affiliated to University of Madras and Anna University for 25 years, Crescent was Deemed to be University by Indian Government and was known as B.S. Abdur Rahman Crescent University. Since 2017, Crescent is known as B.S. Abdur Rahman Crescent Institute of Science and Technology.

Crescent is organized into twelve constituent schools, which together comprise a total of eighteen departments. While Crescent is governed by the Institute's Board of Management, the Institute's Academic Council is the principal academic body that supervises Crescent's academic policy. Additionally, each department constitutes a Board of Studies composed of experts from academia and industry, deliberates and finalizes the curriculum for the respective programmes.

== History ==
B.S. Abdur Rahman Crescent Institute of Science and Technology was founded by philanthropist and entrepreneur B.S. Abdur Rahman in 1984 as B.S. Abdur Rahman Crescent Engineering College, one of the first self-financing engineering institutions in the Indian State of Tamil Nadu. The Tamil Nadu State Government granted permission to establish Crescent as a private engineering college affiliated with the University of Madras in September 1984. Subsequently, the All India Council for Technical Education granted approval for Crescent College in December 1990.

In December 2001, the Tamil Nadu State Government decided to bring all the engineering colleges in the State of Tamil Nadu under Anna University to standardize the curriculum. Consequently, affiliation of Crescent College was changed from the University of Madras to Anna University. This affiliation status continued until 2008, when Crescent was deemed to be University.

On 16 December 2008, the Indian Government, on the advice of the University Grant Commission, granted the status of Institution Deemed to be University to the Crescent.

== Campus ==
Crescent's Campus covers 50 acres and is located in Vandalur, a suburb of Chennai. The campus is located on GST Road between Kilambakkam Bus Terminus and Vandalur Zoo.

== Administration ==
Crescent is governed by the Board of Management and the Academic Council is the principal academic body that supervises Crescent's academic policy. Crescent is organized into twelve constituent schools, which together comprise a total of eighteen departments. Each of these departments constitutes a Board of Studies composed of experts from academia and industry, deliberates and finalizes the curriculum for the respective programmes.

=== Officers ===
==== Chancellor and pro-chancellor ====
The chancellor is a titular head of the Crescent, whose role is largely ceremonial, such as presiding over the convocation. When the chancellor nominates members to bodies, such as board of management, they are required to nominate persons who will advance the objectives of the Crescent as outlined in the memorandum of association.

The pro-chancellor serves as a deputy to the chancellor and is responsible for carrying out the duties assigned to the chancellor when the chancellor is unavailable.

==== Vice-chancellor and pro-vice-chancellor ====
The Vice-Chancellor is the chief executive officer of Crescent, who exercise general supervision and control over the affairs of the Institute. The vice-chancellor is responsible for implementation of decisions made by deliberate bodies, such as the board of management, the academic council, the finance committee and the planning and monitoring board.

==== Head of the department ====
These twelve schools together comprise a total of eighteen departments.

=== Board of management ===
The board of management is the executive council of the Crescent, which makes final decisions on every matter, including academic, administrative, personnel, financial, and developmental matters. The board of management is composed of vice chancellor, pro-vice-chancellor, two deans and three teaching staff of Crescent, three eminent academics nominated by the chancellor, one representative nominated by University Grants Commission and a maximum of four members nominated by the sponsoring body.

== Academics ==
=== Schools ===
Crescent is organized into twelve constituent schools—four engineering and two science schools, as well as Crescent School of Architecture, Crescent School of Business, Crescent School of Law, Crescent School of Pharmacy, School of Arabic and Islamic Studies, and School of Social Sciences and Humanities. The engineering schools are the School of Mechanical Sciences, the School of Infrastructure, the School of Electrical and Communication Sciences and the School of Computer Information and Mathematical Sciences. The science schools are the School of Physical and Chemical Science and the School of Life Sciences.

==== School of Mechanical Sciences ====
The School of Mechanical Sciences has four departments: Mechanical Engineering, Polymer Engineering, Aerospace Engineering, and Automobile Engineering.

==== School of Infrastructure ====
The School of Infrastructure has Department of Civil Engineering, which offers an undergraduate, postgraduate and doctoral programme. The department was established in 1984, making it one of oldest in the Crescent.

==== School of Electrical and Communication Sciences ====
The School of Electrical and Communication Sciences has three departments: Electrical & Electronics Engineering, Electronics & Communication Engineering, and Electronics & Instrumentation Engineering.

==== School of Computer, Information and Mathematical Sciences ====
The School of Mechanical Sciences has four departments: Computer Science & Engineering, Information Technology, Computer Applications and Mathematics & Actuarial Science.

==== School of Life Sciences ====
The School of Life Sciences offers both professional and science degrees in Biotechnology. Additionally, the school offers science degrees in Biochemistry, Molecular Biology and Microbiology.

==== School of Physical and Chemical Sciences ====
The School of Physical and Chemical Sciences has two departments: Physics and Chemistry. The Department of Physics and Department of Chemistry were established in 1984, making it one of oldest in the Crescent.

==== Crescent School of Business ====
Crescent Business of School (CBS) has Department of Management Studies, which offers a postgraduate and doctoral programme. The Department of Management Studies was established in the year 1994.

==== School of Arabic and Islamic Studies ====
The School of Arabic and Islamic Studies was established in 2009. The school combines the faith-based education with modern education, to promote balanced approach to spiritual and religious knowledge. The school offers undergraduate, postgraduate and doctoral programmes.

==== Crescent School of Architecture ====
The Crescent School of Architecture (CSA) was established in 2010. CSA was approved by Council of Architecture in the same year for providing 5-year architecture programme. CSA is an affiliated with Indian Institute of Architects, the oldest Indian professional society for architects. In 2018, Council of Architecture granted CSA permission to offer 2-year postgraduate programme in architecture. In 2019, CSA was approved by AICTE to offer three-year Bachelor of Design programme in Interior Design.

Among its alumni is Mohammed Salman, who went on to co-found Tint Tone and Shade, an interior design firm with a notable presence in Chennai and Hyderabad.

==== School of Social Sciences and Humanities ====
The School of Social Sciences & Humanities was established in 2013. The School of Social Sciences & Humanities has three departments: Public Policy, English and Commerce. Additionally, the school offers courses in Economics, Sociology, German and Tamil to engineering students, to provide holistic perspective on the social and economic values as well as develop their communicative competence.

==== Crescent School of Law ====
Crescent School of Law (CSL) was established in 2017. CSL was approved by Bar Council of India in the same year for providing 5-year law programmes.

==== Crescent School of Pharmacy ====
Crescent School of Pharmacy (CSP) was established in 2017. CSP was approved by Pharmacy Council of India in the same year for providing undergraduate, postgraduate and doctoral programmes in Pharmacy.

=== Centres ===
==== Crescent Innovation and Incubation Council ====
Crescent Innovation and Incubation Council (CIIC) was established in March 2019 as start-up incubator. Crescent's Institution Innovation Council (IIC), aided by CIIC, is approved by Indian Ministry of Education. In 2020, the Indian Ministry of Education granted 5 star rating to IIC based on their performance in Innovation and Entrepreneurship.

==== Centre for Sustainable Development ====
The Centre for Sustainable Development (CSD) advances UN Sustainable Development Goals by promoting sustainable infrastructure and renewable energy. CSD fosters faculty collaboration and strengthens research and international partnerships to further the Sustainable Development Goals.

==== Centre for Innovation in Teaching and Learning ====
The Centre for Innovation in Teaching and Learning (CITL) was established in the year 2018, to explore new teaching strategies and promote innovations in teaching and learning process.

=== Ranking ===
University rankings

Engineering – India
- NIRF (2024): 151–200

Pharmacy – India
- NIRF (2024): 84

Architecture – India
- NIRF (2024): 40

In 2024, the National Institutional Ranking Framework ranked Crescent in the 151–200 band among Indian engineering institutes, 40th among architecture schools and 84th among pharmacy institute.

== Notable alumni ==
P. V. Midhun Reddy represents Rajampet as Member of Parliament in Lok Sabha. Alumni celebrities include actor Arya, actor Karthi, and actress Priya Bhavani Shankar. Arun kumar T C
