= Shyama Raju =

Entrepreneur and educationist (born 1947)

P Shyama Raju
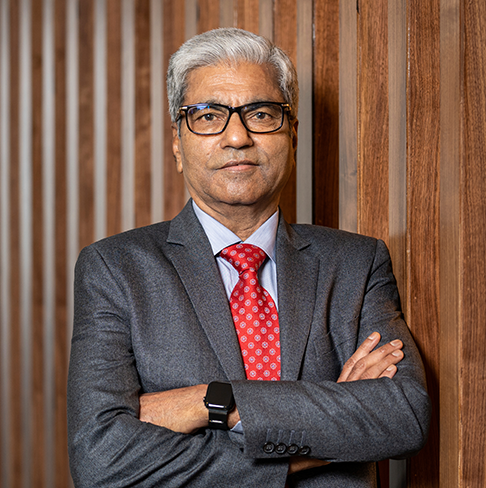
- XD
- Occupations: Chancellor, REVA University, Bengaluru. Chairman of Rukmini Educational Charitable Trust. Chairman & Managing Director, DivyaSree Developers Pvt. Ltd., Bengaluru.
- Spouse: Late Smt.Rukmini Shyama Raju
- Website: https://www.reva.edu.in/

P. Shyama Raju is an Indian entrepreneur, philanthropist and an educationist based in Bengaluru, Karnataka. He is the chairman and managing director of DivyaSree, he is also the chairman of Rukmini Educational Charitable Trust and the chancellor of REVA University, Bengaluru. He holds prominent positions and memberships in reputed institutions across India. He is also on the board of many companies in the field of infrastructure development, charitable institutions and welfare trusts. In 2017, the Chief Minister of Karnataka Shri Siddaramaiah awarded him the Karnataka Rajyotsava award. He is currently appointed as the Chairman of the India ASEAN Trade Council 2022.

== Business career ==
Raju founded his pilot project DivyaSree Chambers. DivyaSree is a commercial property developer, especially in metro cities like Bengaluru and Hyderabad. It was presented with the NDTV Property awards 2016 for Luxury villa project of the year.

Raju founded the REVA Group of Educational Institutions under Rukmini Educational Charitable Trust. The vision of the Trust is to establish and provide a global standard of education to the aspiring youth of the country in higher education. The Karnataka Government invited the Trust to start REVA University in Bengaluru.

== Awards and honors ==
- Honorary doctorate (honoris causa) by Visvesvaraya Technological University, Belagavi in 2015.
- BERG Education Awards - Distinguished and Innovative Educationist in 2015.
- Visionary Educationist 2016 award for Sir. M. Visvesvaraya Shiromani Award.
- Global Asian of the year 2017.
- The Hindu Group, "The Doyens", Guardian of Knowledge - Exemplary Commitment and Impactful Positive Contribution to Education in Karnataka in 2017.
- Global Education Forum, Geneva, Switzerland - Exemplary Leader in Internationalization of Indian Education in 2018.
- 10th Annual India Leadership Conclave & Indian Affairs Business Leadership Awards - Indian Affairs Indian of the Year(Education) in 2019.
- Forbes India Magazine - Featured on their cover page in the special edition issue on Global Indian Brands and Leaders in 2019.
- Awarded as Asia One Person of the Year 2018-19 by Asia One Magazine and United Research Services Media Consulting
- Honoured by The Statement Election Commission, Government of Karnataka for the contribution in creating awareness on voting and civic rights in the City 2019 - On 25 January 2019
- Awarded the Indian affairs Indian of the year 2019 (Education) by Indian leadership conclave 2019
- Nominated as the Karnataka Education Board Mentoring System Committee Member in June 2020.
- REVA Life Time Achievement Award to R. SUNDARAM Chairman & Managing Director – Sundaram Architects Pvt. Ltd
- ET-EDGE recognizes Dr. P. Shyama Raju Chancellor, REVA University as the Most Promising Business Leader of Asia for his exemplary leadership qualities
- Edupreneur of the Year award by ET Now
- Chairman of the India ASEAN Trade Council 2022
- Recognised as the "Edupreneur" of the year (Social cause & Nation Building) by R. World Institutional Ranking in 2022.
- Awarded ‘Global Sustainability Awards 2022’ for his professional commitment towards Global Sustainability by the Global Council for the Promotion of International Trade (GCPIT).
- Dr P. Shyama Raju won the Education Leaders Award for 2023 at Oxford University, UK.
- Eminent Speaker for Global Green Education at the NYC Green School Conference 2023

== List of magazines featured ==
- The Education Trajectory Highlights - August 2021
- Higher Education Digest – January 2020
- Passion Vista – December 2019
- Higher Education Digest – November 2019
- Seasonal Magazine – July 2019
- Diplomacy & Beyond Plus (A Journal of Foreign Policy & National Affairs) – July 2019
- OPEN Magazine – May 2019
- Forbes India – March 2019
- OPEN Magazine – March 2019
- CAREERS360 – January 2019
- Higher Education Review – December 2018
- FORBES India – September 2018
