= Crescent School of Architecture =

Architecture School in Tamil Nadu, India

- Other name: CSA
- Type: Private Architecture School
- Established: May 11, 2010; 16 years ago
- Parent institution: B.S. Abdur Rahman Crescent Institute of Science and Technology
- Accreditation: COA; AICTE
- Affiliations: IIA
- Dean: Prof. G. Jayalakshmi
- Academic staff: 48 (2024)
- Students: 326 (2024)
- Undergraduates: 314 (2024)
- Postgraduates: 12 (2024)
- Location: 120, Seethakathi Estate, GST Road, Vandalur, Tamil Nadu, India; 12°52′31″N 80°5′0″E
- Campus: Suburban Campus
- Website: Official Website

The Crescent School of Architecture (CSA) is one of the constituent professional schools of B.S. Abdur Rahman Crescent Institute of Science and Technology, Tamil Nadu, India. The CSA awards the degrees of Bachelor of Architecture (B.Arch), Bachelor of Design (B.Des) in Interior Architecture, and Master of Architecture (M.Arch), with the approval of Council of Architecture (COA) and All India Council for Technical Education (AICTE). The CSA is affiliated with Indian Institute of Architects, the national professional association for architects.

The CSA building has won the Archdaily Building of the Year award in the educational architecture category.

== History ==
The CSA was established in 2010 as a constituent professional school of B.S. Abdur Rahman Crescent Institute of Science and Technology, offering architectural and design education. The Council of Architecture has approved the CSA's 5-year Bachelor of Architecture (B.Arch) program as meeting the standards for architectural qualification required to register as an architect with the council. In 2013, the Council of Architecture further expanded the approval for an additional 40 students, bringing the intake capacity of the CSA to 80 students per academic year.

In 2017, the CSA started offering 4-year Bachelor of Design in Interior Architecture. The programme has been accredited by All India Council for Technical Education (AICTE) since 2019.

In 2018, the CSA started offering 2-year Master of Architecture (M.Arch) programme with approval of Council of Architecture.

== Campus ==
The CSA is housed in a building designed by Architects Biju Kuriakose and Kishore Panikkar. The architects stated that they wanted CSA to be different from a typical school, which would house endless corridors with rooms on either side. They wanted to create spaces offering opportunities for discussions and chance encounters. The building features a design in which the ground plane is multiplied and staggered at each level, creating a new ground at every floor level within the building. This design creates a continuous, stepped void that acts as a diagonal courtyard and serves as the school's key congregational and social space. The building won the ArchDaily Building of the Year award in 2020 for the educational architecture category.

== Organization and administration ==
The CSA is a constituent school of B.S. Abdur Rahman Crescent Institute of Science and Technology, which is also known as Crescent. The CSA is under the governance of the Crescent Board of Management, and its academic policy is supervised by the Crescent Academic Council. A Dean heads the CSA. The CSA Board of Studies reviews and formulates the school's academic policy and submits it to the Crescent Academic Council for approval.

=== Administration ===
==== Dean ====
The Dean is responsible for developing and implementing the strategic vision and goals, managing financial and academic affairs, overseeing governance, and promoting the overall quality of the degree programmes. The Dean serves as chairperson of the CSA Board of Studies, overseeing and coordinating the periodic review of curriculum, including teaching and evaluation methodology. The Dean serves as a selection committee member, recruiting academic staff for the school. The Dean supervises the performance of academic and administrative staff and coordinates their professional development.

==== Design Chair ====
The Design Chair continuously supervises the teaching and evaluation of courses with studio courses and theory-studio integrated courses. The Design Chair regularly recommends improvement in teaching and evaluation methods of these courses to the Dean.

==== Board of Studies ====
The CSA Board of Studies is chaired by the Dean and consists of the academic staffs of the school and practicing architects. The Board periodically reviews the curriculum based on current market requirements and projections, emerging teaching and evaluation methodology and regulatory and policy changes.

=== Audit ===
==== Department Academic Audit Committee ====
Each semester, the Department Academic Audit Committee is constituted to ensure students' attainment of course outcomes. The Committee audits the teaching, learning, and evaluation process of each course taught during that semester, by reviewing the teaching materials and aids, assessment methods, and coursework evaluation. If necessary, it recommends corrective measures to the course tutor.

==== Class Committee ====
Each semester, a Class Committee is constituted for each class. The Committee of each class is composed of all its course tutors for that semester and two of its students. The Committee is chaired by an academic staff who does not teach any courses to the class. The Committee serves as a forum for receiving in-depth and periodic feedback from the students on the teaching, learning, and evaluation process of each course taught during that semester.

== Academics ==
=== Accreditation and affiliation ===
The CSA is an affiliated institute of Indian Institute of Architects, the national professional association for architects.

The CSA is approved by Council of Architecture to offer 5-year Bachelor of Architecture (B.Arch) programme and 2-year Master of Architecture (M.Arch). The CSA is approved by All India Council for Technical Education (AICTE) to offer 4-year Bachelor of Design (B.Des) in Interior Architecture.

=== Reputation and rankings ===
College rankings

Architecture – India
- NIRF (2024): 40

In 2024, the National Institutional Ranking Framework ranked CSA as 5th best Architecture and Planning institute in Tamil Nadu, and 40th in India.
