= ETA Star Group =

UAE investment company

ETA Star Group is an investment company headquartered in Dubai, United Arab Emirates. It is a joint-venture between Al Ghurair and Tamil entrepreneur and philanthropist B.S. Abdur Rahman.

== Company performance ==
Established in 1973, ETA Star Group is a private company headquartered in Dubai employing about 70,000 people in 23 countries with annual sales of US$6.5 billion. The ETA Star Group organization encompasses 140 entities and associate offices, with involvement in a number of verticals including automobiles, manufacturing, assembly, insurance, facility management, consumer electronics, real estate, contracting, engineering, aviation, hospitality, oil, natural gas, information technology, travel, leisure, trading, shipping and transportation.

== Investments ==
ETA has invested in nearly 100 divisions including General, an air conditioning manufacturer, in India.

== Legal case ==
In Emirates Trading Agency Llc (part of the group) v Prime Mineral Exports Private Ltd., an obligation relating to engage in "friendly discussion" as the first stage of an agreed approach to resolving disputes was upheld as enforceable by the Commercial Court of England and Wales.
