= B. S. Abdur Rahman =

Indian entrepreneur (1927–2015)

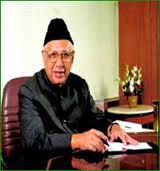
- Born: 15 October 1927; Kilakarai, Ramnad District, Madras Presidency, British India (now Ramanathapuram district, Tamil Nadu, India)
- Died: 7 January 2015 (aged 87); Chennai, Tamil Nadu, India
- Other names: Sena Aana, House of Buhari
- Occupations: Entrepreneur, philanthropist, educationist
- Known for: Founder Chancellor of B. S. Abdur Rahman University; Founder of ETA Ascon Star Group; Founder of Star Health and Allied Insurance; Founder of West Asia Maritime; Founder of Amana Investments; Founder of East Coast Constructions & Industries
- Spouses: Muthu Zulaiha Beevi, Rahmatunisa Azeez
- Children: 6

Buhari Syed Abdur Rahman (15 October 1927 – 7 January 2015) was an Indian entrepreneur, philanthropist and educationist. He had a range of business interests in the UAE and India (in Tamil Nadu) including maritime shipping, real estate, insurance etc. He founded numerous schools, colleges, hospitals and universities. He was one of the 24 Indians to feature in The 500 Most Influential Muslims, an annual publication which ranks the most influential Muslims in the world.

Abdur Rahman was the Vice-Chairperson of Emirates Trading Agency (commonly known as ETA Star) and Ascon Group, a Dubai-based conglomerate from 1973 to 2015. He is the founder of B. S. Abdur Rahman University (earlier named Crescent Engineering College), one of the first privately owned engineering colleges in Chennai. He was the Chairman of East Coast Constructions and Industries, West Asia Exports and Imports, West Asia Maritime, Buhari Group, Amana Investments in Hong Kong and Transcar India. He was also the Vice-Chairman of Coal & Oil and Coastal Energy. He founded India's first stand-alone health insurer Star Health and Allied Insurance with the help of Oman Insurance Company.

East Coast Constructions and Industries, founded in 1962, built several landmarks in Chennai including Gemini Flyover, Kodambakkam Flyover, Chepauk Stadium, Chennai Citi Centre, Government General Hospital, Valluvar Kottam, the Marina Lighthouse, Apollo Hospital complex (Greams Road) and the Omandurar hospital. He died on 7 January 2015 at the age of 87.

Abdur Rahman pursued a number of philanthropic endeavours, donating large amounts of money to various charitable organisations and concentrating on the upliftment of economically weaker sections through the Seethakathi Trust & Zakaat Fund Foundation.

== Early life ==
B. S. Abdur Rahman was born in Kilakarai, Tamil Nadu, India, in a middle-class Marakkar family, the son of Bhukari Aalim. His father was a prominent Pearl Trader in South Asia. He completed his Secondary School Level at Schwartz School, Ramanathapuram & Hameedia High School, Kilakarai. He had four sons and two daughters. He started his business in Sri Lanka with his elder brother Abdul Kader prominently called Thaika Vapa in Tamil Nadu. He had a sister and after her accidental death, B.S. Abdul Rahman started a Women's College in his sister's name Thassim Beevi Abdul Kader College for Women in his home town. He has started so many schools and colleges in Tamil Nadu.

== Business career ==
At the age of fifteen, Abdur Rahman first went to Colombo with just ₹149. He worked as an errand boy for diamond merchants. He was at the time staying at rent-free accommodation with traders from Kilakarai but he had to fetch tea for them from a nearby hotel, clean the rooms and perform other menial tasks.

A lesser person perhaps would have thrown in the towel. But Sena Aana was made of sterner stuff. Before long, he used his persuasive skills to obtain gemstones on credit from another merchant and began trading in them. In time he became a successful gem trader. The base that Abdur Rahman built in Ceylon was to help him in all his future activities.

"The world is the winner when business is not just about self but also about society."

— B. S. Abdur Rahman

He began visiting Belgium, then as now, a centre of the gem trade, the USA, and South America and set up business in Penang, Malaysia, Madras (now Chennai), Kolkata (then Calcutta), and then in Hong Kong. It was in Hong Kong that his business flourished. Incidentally, Abdur Rahman was the first person from Kilakarai to go to Hong Kong.

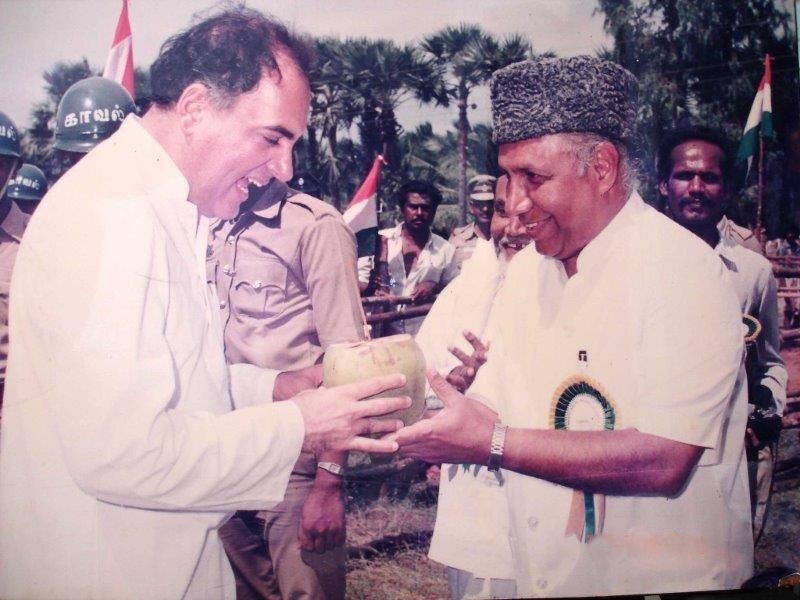
BSA with Former Indian PM Rajiv Gandhi.

In Hong Kong, he launched the Precious Trading Company in 1954. Later, his very special brainchild, the Amana Group of Hong Kong, was established. It was under its banner that the multi-national company ETA-Ascon came into existence. BSA Rahman is credited as a production facilitator in MGR Pictures' Ulagam Sutrum Valiban for a film shoot in Hong Kong.

ETA Group was started in Dubai in 1973 as a partnership with a friend, Abdullah Al-Ghurair, Chairman of the Al Ghurair Group of companies. The global asset bubble triggered by Nixon Shock catapulted him into a rupee billionaire in the 1970s, and diversification made him a dollar billionaire by the 1990s. Originally a civil construction contractor, ETA-Ascon expanded into trading, elevator and electrical installations, real estate, mechanical engineering, building maintenance, car dealerships, and, most recently, shipping and aviation. It employs over 54,000 people across 16 industry verticals. ETA-Ascon is today the flagship of BSA Rahman's vast industrial empire.

== Contribution in education ==
Abdur Rahman felt that education is the key that opens the solutions to the socio-economic problems of society. Hence he founded the following institutions through which all his educational and literacy activities are carried out.

- The Seethakathi Trust
- All India Islamic Foundation
- B.S. Abdur Rahman University
- Thassim Beevi Abdul Kader College for Women
- Islamic Studies & Cultural Centre
- B.S. Abdur Rahman Zakat Foundation Trust

== Board memberships ==
Apart from ETA, Abdur Rahman held the following positions in other companies :

- Chairman, Buhari Holding (P) Ltd., Chennai
- Chairman, ABR Enterprises (P) Ltd., Chennai
- Chairman, West Asia Maritime Ltd., Chennai
- Chairman, West Asia Exports & Imports Pvt Ltd., Chennai
- Chairman, East Coast Constructions & Industries (P) Ltd., Chennai
- Chairman, Sethu Investments Pvt Ltd., Chennai

== Philanthropy ==
=== Youth welfare activities ===
Abdur Rahman felt that a sound mind in a sound body is a healthy trend for the development of the youth in this country. Hence much importance is being given to NSS, NCC, Scouts and other youth activities in all his institutions. Hence to promote sports activities and to imbibe sports culture in the minds of youngsters, he constructed and donated a stadium with all facilities for indoor games, a gymnasium and a gallery to the Tamil Nadu Govt. under the purview of Sports Authority of Tamil Nadu during 1997. The stadium was inaugurated by Anbazhagan, Minister of Education, in the presence of Dhanushkodi Athithan, Minister of State.

=== Economical support works ===
Abdur Rahman was the founder of the United Economic Forum through which he organized a number of economic development activities and encouraged social work.

=== Orphanages ===
Abdur Rahman has founded and financially aided the following orphanages :

- Al-Mumin Seethakathi Children Home, Sakkaraikottai, Ramanathapuram District
- Al-Mumin Umar Pulavar Children Home, Ottapidaram, V.O.C. District
- Al-Mumin Shahul Hameed (Wali) Children Home, Thanjavur, Thanjavur District
- Al-Mumin K.T.M.S. Hamid Children Home (Girls), Kilakarai, Ramnad District
- Al-Mumin Malik Dinar Children Home (Girls), Thiruvithancode

== Awards and honours ==
In recognition of his services in the fields of education, business, health care, social service and communal harmony, the Sathyabama University has conferred an Honorary Doctorate on him in 2005.

== Gallery ==
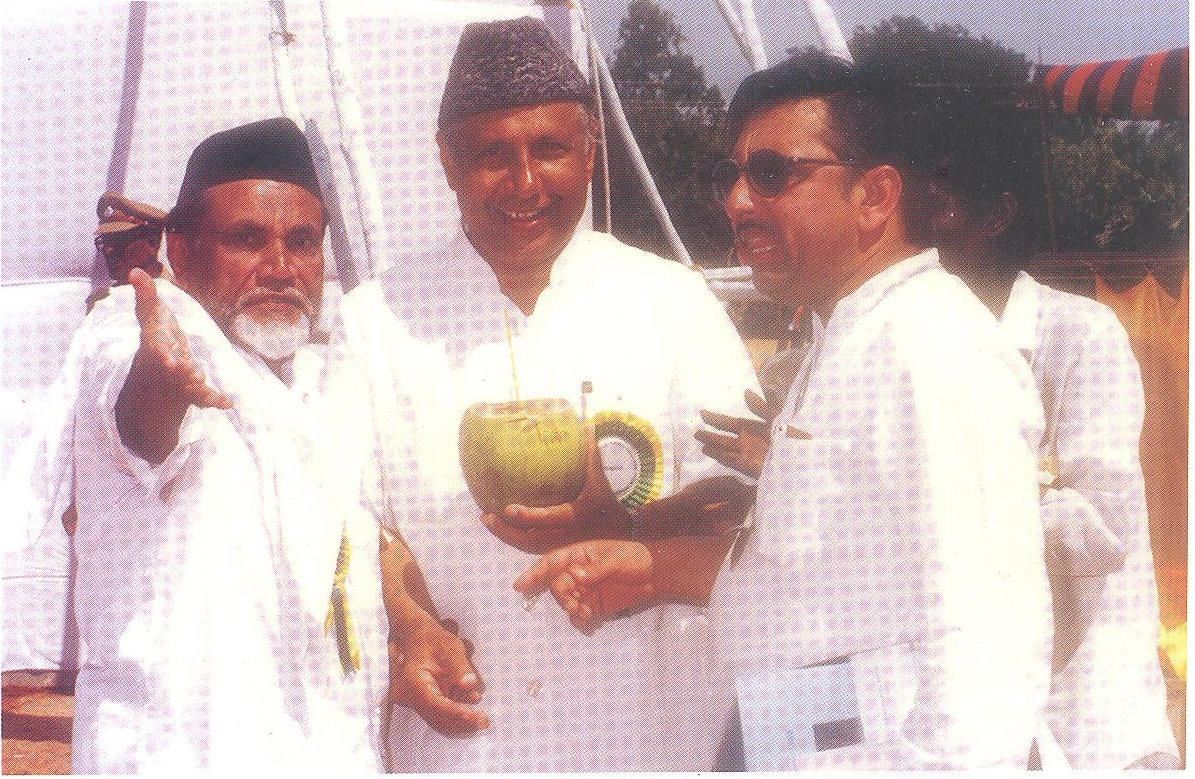
Congress MP - Mr.Mani Shankar Aiyar

== See also ==
- Kilakarai
- Tamil Muslim
- ETA Star Group
- Crescent Engineering College
