= Arvindbhai Patel Institute of Environmental Design =

Environmental design school of Sardar Patel University

- Institute logo
- Established: 1980
- Academic affiliations: Sardar Patel University
- Principal: Prof Sanjay Pitroda (D C Patel School of Architecture) (APIED) (Bhaikaka Centre for Human Settlements),
- Director: Shri Kiran Patel
- Location: Vallabh Vidhyanagar, Gujarat, India
- Website: http://www.apied.edu.in/

Arvindbhai Patel Institute of Environmental Design (APIED or simply IED) is an academic institute of higher education affiliated to Sardar Patel University located in the town of Anand in the state of Gujarat, India. It offers courses in Architecture, Interior design and Urban Planning.

== History ==
APIED was founded in 1980 at Vadodara by Ar. Suryakant Patel, Mr. Himmatbhai Patel, Ar. Rasik Shah, Er. Mahindra Modi, Mr. Prabhudas Patel, and Mr. Bhupen Kakkar. The institute was later shifted and established at Vallabh Vidhyanagar in 1984 under the patronage of late Dr. H.M.Patel who was then the finance minister of India and chairman of Charutar Vidya Mandal. The institute presently functions under the umbrella of Charutar Vidya Mandal and Parisar Trust at Vallabh Vidyanagar.

== Campus ==
The Institute is spread over a 2.5 acre urban campus located close to Shastri Ground, the nodal center of the town of Vallabh Vidhyanagar. The campus building was originally designed by Ar. Suryakant Patel and Ar. Rasik Shah.

== Academics ==
D.C. Patel School of Architecture (offering Bachelor of Architecture)

H.M. Patel School of Interior Design (offering Bachelor of Interior Design and Master of Interior Design)

Bhaikaka Center for Human Settlements (offering Master of Urban Planning)
