= Jawaharlal Nehru Architecture and Fine Arts University =

Fine arts university in India

- Established: 2008; 18 years ago
- Chancellor: Governor of Telangana
- Vice-Chancellor: T. Gangadhar (I/C)
- Location: Masab Thank, Hyderabad, Telangana, 500028, India; 17.4029113°N 78.454711°E
- Campus: Urban
- Website: www.jnafau.ac.in

Jawaharlal Nehru Architecture and Fine Arts University (JNAFAU), is an architecture and fine arts university located at Masab Tank, Hyderabad, Telangana, India. JNAFAU has two colleges which offer several undergraduate, postgraduate and PhD research programs, with an emphasis of two different colleges: School of Planning & Architecture and College of Fine Arts. It was established by the erstwhile Hyderabad State in 1940, as the "College of Fine Arts".

In School of Planning & Architecture offers courses such as Architecture, Digital Techniques for Design & Planning, Facilities and Services Planning, Interior Designing, Planning, etc. in School of planning and Architecture.

In College of Fine Arts courses such as painting, Applied Arts, Photography, Animation, Sculpture, etc., are offered.

== History ==
The university has its roots in College of Fine Arts, which started as a 'School of Arts and Crafts' to promote arts and local crafts, the college has gradually grown in stature as the "Government College of Arts and Architecture" under the management of the Department of Technical Education, Government of Telangana, Hyderabad.

With the establishment of Jawaharlal Nehru Technological University in Oct. 1972, the college merged with the university and became a Constituent College of the JNT University. The Jawaharlal Nehru Technological University has been bifurcated and divided into four different universities, such as JNTU Anantapur, JNTU Kakinada, JNTU Hyderabad, & JNAFAU, Hyderabad established under A.P. Legislature Act No.31 of 2008 as per the above act, the JNTU College of Fine Arts, has become one of the Constituent College of newly firmed Jawaharlal Nehru Architecture & Fine Arts University, Masab Tank, Hyderabad w.e.f. 2008–09.

== Affiliated institutions ==
Following educational institutions are affiliated the JNAFAU:

- Annapurna College of Film and Media, Hyderabad
- ICAT Design & Media College, Hyderabad
- C.S.I. Institute of Technology, Secunderabad
- S.A.R. College of Architecture, Agiripally
- Sri Venkateshwara College of Architecture, Hyderabad
- Maestro school of planning and architecture, Hyderabad
- Vaishnavi School of Architecture and Planning, Hyderabad
- Masterji College of Architecture, Vijayawada, Andhra Pradesh
- Deccan School of Planning & Architecture, Hyderabad
- Varaha College of Architecture & Planning, Visakhapatnam
- School of Architecture & Planning, Jawaharlal Nehru Institute of Advanced Studies, Secunderabad.
- J.B.R. Architecture College, Hyderabad
- Lumbini School of Architecture & Town Planning, Nalgonda, Telangana
- Aurora's Design Academy, Hyderabad
- Jawaharlal Nehru Institute of Advanced Studies, School of Architecture & Planning, Hyderabad
- Aurora Design Academy, Hyderabad
- Aurora's Design Institute, Hyderabad
- Ashoka School of Planning and Architecture, Hyderabad
- Woxsen School of Arts & Design, Hyderabad
- Telangana Tribal Welfare Residential Fine Arts Academy for Women, Rajanna Siricilla District, Telangana
- St. Mary's Visual Arts & Design Degree College, Sanga Reddy District, Telangana
- Bonfire Institute of Design, Hyderabad

== See also ==
- Education in India
- Literacy in India
- List of institutions of higher education in Telangana
