= Interior design education =

Interior design education is the teaching of the skills needed to perform interior design work. Education in this field is offered in different parts of the world; however, the application requirements for acceptance vary among countries and schools. There are a number of different routes to attain qualifications in interior design. An interior design education teaches students how to draw and plan a space, as well as covers the latest design software and other coursework to prepare them for the field. Education includes consideration of the design brief, design processes from concept to scheme development, and implementation, as well as exploration of relevant philosophies, trends, sector specialisms, and professional skills required for practice.

This field offers various job opportunities, including business ownership, teaching, and potential advancement within established firms. Additionally, some schools offer education in interior architecture together with interior design. Note that these are not the same fields of study but do overlap.

== Asia ==
Interior design in Asia is an ancient art. Several private institutions and universities offer interior design courses that are at par with the courses offered in the more developed parts of the world. Associate, bachelor's, and master's degrees in interior design are offered by institutes including Raffles, Indian Institute of Architecture and Design, Hong Kong Polytechnic University, and CID.

=== Israel ===
In Israel, colleges are offering four-year baccalaureate degrees in interior design. Some design colleges also offer an interior design program as a stand-alone program.

== Africa ==
Interior design education has been offered in South Africa since the 1870s, and this education is on par with programs offered in most developed countries of the world. In Africa, interior design programs are offered at universities, institutes of technology, and at registered private colleges.

== Europe ==
In Europe, the educational requirements differ between interior architects (considered a profession comparable to that of architects or structural engineers) and interior designers (considered a trade comparable to carpenters).

Traditionally in Germany, interior architecture has been taught at polytechnic universities or universities of applied sciences. Baccalaureate programs are normally three years (6 semesters) in length. In Germany, the adaptation of the university system to the international degrees of bachelor and master has led to a restructuring of degree programs. Since university education traditionally lasted at least five years, many diploma programs have been transformed into consecutive graduate master programs. Some European universities form partnerships with other universities to offer "internationally orientated Masters courses" in interior design, where parts of the course takes place between European partner institutions to offer comprehensive instruction in the interior design program, including preparation for the interior design qualification exam.

In the UK around fifty universities and art colleges offer 3-year degree courses and, in some cases, year-long Master of Arts (MA) courses in interior design. London's Royal College of Art is the world's leading centre for post-graduate studies in art and design subjects and offers a two-year MA program in interior design that is recognised as the foremost course in the subject. Manchester Metropolitan University runs a Bachelor of Arts (BA) (Hons.) course in interior design.

== North America ==
=== Canada ===
Canadian interior design education can be acquired at the college or university level. Unlike the programs offered in the United States, a degree is not required to become a registered professional designer. Admission to programs requires suitable marks and creative ability as demonstrated in a portfolio submission. Once accepted into a program, seven years of combined educational and work experience is required before one can take the professional examination to become a registered interior designer. Therefore, if someone graduates from a three-year college diploma program, they will need a minimum of four years working experience, whereas someone graduating from a four-year degree program only needs three. Master's degree programs in interior design are far less common in Canada, with the most established being at the University of Manitoba.

=== United States ===
==== Interior Design degree offerings ====
In the United States, many universities and colleges offer four-year baccalaureate degrees in interior design. Some design colleges also offer the interior design program as a stand-alone program. Master's degrees (MS, MA, MFA and recently the MID) in interior design are also available, although these advanced degrees are less common than the baccalaureate degree. Many professionals pursue advanced degrees in related subjects, such as industrial design, fine arts, or education. PhD programs in interior design are increasing in number at various institutions of higher education, but only in certain states.

==== Distance education in Interior Design ====
Educational institutions have expanded beyond the traditional, studio-based instruction in interior design by offering online degree programs for distance learners of interior design. The online degree programs, like the ones offered in traditional form, feature comprehensive curriculums that range from 60-credit diploma courses to certificate programs, and to as many as 132 credits for a full baccalaureate degree program.

== See also ==
- Interior architecture
- Interior design
