= Bachelor of Architectural Studies =

The Bachelor of Architectural Studies is a bachelor's degree for studies in the field of architecture. It generally takes three to four years. A Bachelor of Architectural Studies may lead to a Master of Architecture, or a Bachelor of Architecture. In some countries, this degree may allow people to be officially registered as an architect; see Professional requirements for architects
