= Uka Tarsadia University =

University in Bardoli, Surat, Gujarat, India

Coordinates: 21.0686°N 73.1329°E

- Motto: Imparting Knowledge, Awakening Wisdom, Transforming Lives
- Type: Private
- Established: 2011
- Founders: Biku Patel and Tushar Patel
- President: Shailesh R. Patel
- Vice-Chancellor: Dr. Y. P. Kosta
- Location: Bardoli, Surat, Gujarat, India
- Website: utu.ac.in

The Uka Tarsadia University is a Private University located in Bardoli, Surat, Gujarat, India. It was established by Tushar Patel and B.U. Patel, founders of Tarsadia Investments.

The university was ranked 91st in India by the NIRF in the pharmacy ranking in 2024.

== Programmes ==
- Ph.D. Programmes
- Post Graduate Programmes
- Graduate Programmes
- Diploma Programmes
- Certification Programmes
  University rankings
  Pharmacy – India
  - NIRF (2024): 91

== Constituent Institutes ==
- Shrimad Rajchandra Institute of Management & Computer Application
- Babu Madhav Institute of Information & Technology (BMIIT)
- C.G.Bhakta Institute of Biotechnology
- Maliba Pharmacy College
- Chhotubhai Gopalbhai Patel Institute of Technology (CGPIT)
- B.V.Patel Institute of Management,
- B.V.Patel Institute of Computer & Information Technology
- B.V.Patel Institute of Commerce
- Maliba-Bhula Nursing College
- Shrimad Rajchandra School of Sports
- Shrimad Rajchandra College of Physiotherapy
- Department Of Computer Science And Technology
- Diwaliba Polytechnic, Maliba Mahuva Campus
- Raman Bhakta School of Architecture (RBSA)
- Godavariba School of Interior Design (GSID)
- Jaymin School of Fashion Design & Technology (JFDT)
- Asha M. Tarsadia Institute of Computer Science and Technology
- Tarsadia Institute of Chemical Science (TICS)

== Departments ==
- Department of Computer Science and Technology
- Department of Management & Commerce
- Department of Physics
- Department of Mathematics
- Department of Humanities
