= REVA University =

Private university in Karnataka, India

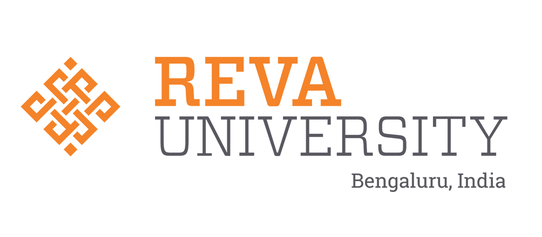
- Motto: Knowledge is Power
- Type: Private
- Established: 2012
- Accreditation: NAAC A+
- Chancellor: Dr. P. Shyama Raju
- Vice-Chancellor: Dr. Sanjay R. Chitnis
- Total staff: 1000+
- Undergraduates: 14000+
- Postgraduates: 2000+
- Location: Rukmini Knowledge Park, Kattigenahalli, Yelahanka, Bangalore, Karnataka, 560064, India
- Language: English
- Website: www.reva.edu.in

REVA University is a private university in Kattigenahalli, Yelahanka, Bangalore. It was established under the Government of Karnataka Act, 2012. It is managed by the Rukmini Educational Charitable Trust. The university currently offers UG, PG and several certificate/diploma-level programs in engineering, architecture, science & technology, commerce, management, law, & arts. The university also facilitates research leading to doctoral degrees in all disciplines. Dr. P. Shyama Raju is the chancellor of the university.

== History ==
REVA Group of Institutions was established in the year 2004 by Rukmini Educational Charitable Trust, a unit of DivyaSree Group.

== Campus ==
The university campus is spread over 45 acres (18 ha) that houses many multi-department, an incubation center for start-ups, a hostel, and medical facilities. Over 18,000 students study different courses.

== Academics ==
The university is organized into the following schools

- Faculty of Engineering and Technology
  - School of Computer Science and Engineering
  - School of Computing and Information Technology
  - School of Electrical and Electronics Engineering
  - School of Electronics and Communication Engineering
  - School of Mechanical Engineering
  - School of Civil Engineering
- Faculty of Architecture
  - School of Architecture
  - School of Design
- Faculty of Commerce and Management Studies
  - School of Commerce
  - School of Management Studies
- REVA Business School
- Faculty of Arts, Humanities and Social Sciences
  - School of Arts, Humanities and Social Sciences
- Faculty of Science and Technology
  - School of Computer Science and Applications
  - School of Applied Sciences
  - School of Allied Health Sciences
- Faculty of Law
  - School of Legal Studies
- Faculty of Performing Arts and Indic Studies
  - School of Performing Arts and Indic Studies

== Publications / journals / newsletter ==
- Insight Newsletter – quarterly
- Criya Magazine – quarterly
- FACES Magazine – annual
- Reflections – annual

== Books ==
- Book titled “Revisiting Mythologies, Rethinking women” by Dr. G Beena, Associate Dean, School of Arts & Humanities
- Book titled “The Nagas: Social and Cultural Identity - Texts and Contexts” by Dr. Payel Dutta Chowdhury, Director – School of Arts & Humanities
- Book titled “The women of phoolbari and other short stories” by Dr. Payel Dutta Chowdhury, Director – School of Arts & Humanities
- Book titled “Engineering Drawing” by Dr. K S Narayanaswamy, Director – School of Mechanical Engineering & Dr. L Mahesh, Associate Professor, School of Mechanical Engineering
- Book titled "Communication Protocol Engineering" by Pallapa Venkataram, Sunilkumar S Manvi (Dean-Faculty of Engineering), B Satish Babu, PHI,2010.
- Book titled "Computer Concepts and C Programming-A Holistic Approach to learning C, B S Anami, S A Angadi, Sunilkumar S Manvi (Dean-Faculty of Engineering), PHI, 2010.
- Book titled "Wireless and Mobile Networks", Sunilkumar S Manvi (Dean-Faculty of Engineering), Mahabaleshwar Kakasgeri, Wiley India, 2014.
- Book titled "Cloud Computing Concepts and Protocols", Sunilkumar S Manvi (Dean-Faculty of Engineering), Gopal Krishna Shyam, CRC press, 2021.
- Book titled "Programming with R", S R Manishekar, Jagadish, Srinivas, Sunilkumar S Manvi (Dean-Faculty of Engineering), CENGAGE, 2018.
- Book titled "Computer Networks", Sunilkumar S Manvi (Dean-Faculty of Engineering), Narosa, 2009.

== Notable alumni ==
- Priyanka Prabhakara - Indian basketball player.

== Ranking ==
- REVA University ranked Gold in QS I∙GAUGE rating 2019.
- Ranked 48 in top 50 B-Schools by Chronicle India Survey 2019. A graded institute in Karnataka as per the survey by Chronicle India Survey 2019.
- REVA University was ranked 18th among engineering institutes by the Times Engineering Survey in 2020.
- Ranked 14th in the Outlook-ICARE India University Rankings 2019: Top 25 Young Universities.
- Ranked tenth among private engineering institutes by the Times Engineering Survey in 2020.
- Ranked tenth among private engineering institutes by the Times Engineering Survey in 2020.
- The National Institutional Ranking Framework (NIRF) ranked the university between 201-300 in the engineering rankings in 2024.
  University rankings
  Engineering – India
  - NIRF (2024): 201-300
