= South African Institute of Architects =

South African professional organization

The South African Institute of Architects (SAIA) is an association of affiliated and regional institutes that promotes excellence of architectural design in South Africa. It replaced the Institute of South African Architects and a number of regional bodies in 1996.

== Background ==
SAIA was formed in 1996, replacing the Institute of South African Architects (formed in 1927) and six regional institutes, namely the Border, Cape, Eastern Province, KwaZulu-Natal, Orange Free State and Transvaal. Membership is open to any qualified architect and candidate membership is open to anyone studying towards becoming an architect.

== Activities ==
Since 2010 the SAIA has hosted a biannual conference and exhibition to share ideas. In 2018 the AZA conference was held jointly at the University of Pretoria and Tshwane University of Technology.

== Awards and prizes ==
The Corobrik SAIA Awards are given out at a biannual ceremony to reward excellence in South African architecture. The Awards of Excellence have been given out since 1990, while the Awards of Merit were introduced in 1999. In 2016 there were seven Awards of Excellence, seven Awards of Merit and sixteen commendations handed out. In 2018 six Awards of Excellence were given to five buildings and a research project. There were twenty four Awards of Merit and five commendations bestowed.

The SAIA also awards a Gold Medal for Architecture to an outstanding individual, a Medal of Distinction to someone who has given distinguished service to the profession and an Architectural Writers and Critics Award for an individual's contribution to architectural writing or criticism.
