= International Standard Classification of Education =

Education levels

The International Standard Classification of Education (ISCED) is a framework for organizing and comparing education systems globally. It is a member of the international family of economic and social classifications of the United Nations.

== History ==
ISCED was introduced in the 1970s to standardize the collection and comparison of education statistics across countries. The first version, known as ISCED 1976, was approved by the International Conference on Education (Geneva, 1975), and was subsequently endorsed by UNESCO's 19th General Conference in 1976.

The second version, known as ISCED 1997, was approved by the UNESCO General Conference at its 29th session in November 1997 as part of efforts to increase the international comparability of education statistics. It introduced 7 education levels and classification by fields of study. The UNESCO Institute for Statistics led the development of a third version, which was adopted by UNESCO's 36th General Conference in November 2011 and which will replace ISCED 1997 in international data collections in the coming years. ISCED 2011 expanded the framework from 7 to 9 levels, providing greater detail in education classification, created by dividing the tertiary pre-doctorate level into three levels. It also extended the lowest level (ISCED 0) to cover a new sub-category of early childhood educational development programmes, which target children below the age of three years.

During the review and revision, which led to the adoption of ISCED 2011, UNESCO Member States agreed that the fields of education should be examined in a separate process. This review is now underway with the view to establishing an independent but related classification called the ISCED Fields of Education and Training.

Related materials from the European Centre for the Development of Vocational Training and also Eurostat provide further information and statistical guidance for the classification of sub-fields of education as a companion to ISCED.

== 2011 Version ==
ISCED 2011 levels of education
Level	Label	Description
0	Early childhood education (01 Early childhood educational development)	Education designed to support early development in preparation for participation in school and society. Programmes designed for children below the age of 3.
0	Early childhood education (02 Pre-primary education)	Education designed to support early development in preparation for participation in school and society. Programmes designed for children from age 3 to the start of primary education.
1	Primary education	Provides foundational skills in reading, writing, and mathematics and to establish a solid foundation for learning.
2	Lower secondary education	The first stage of secondary education with a subject-oriented curriculum.
3	Upper secondary education	The final stage of secondary education preparing students for higher education or employment. Usually with an increased range of subject options and streams.
4	Post-secondary non-tertiary education	Programmes providing learning experiences that build on secondary education and prepare for labour market entry or tertiary education. The content is broader than secondary but not as complex as tertiary education.
5	Short-cycle tertiary education	Short first tertiary programmes that are typically practically-based, occupationally-specific and prepare for labour market entry. These programmes may also provide a pathway to other tertiary programmes.
6	Bachelor's or equivalent	Provides undergraduate-level academic or professional education.
7	Master's or equivalent	Programmes designed to provide advanced academic or professional knowledge, skills and competencies leading to a second tertiary degree or equivalent qualification.
8	Doctorate or equivalent	Focuses on advanced research leading to a doctoral degree.

=== ISCED 2011 levels, categories, and sub-categories ===
Source:International Standard Classification of Education (ISCED).

- 0 EARLY CHILDHOOD EDUCATION
  - 01 Early childhood educational development
  - 02 Pre-primary education
- 1 PRIMARY EDUCATION
  - 10 Primary education
- 2 LOWER SECONDARY EDUCATION
  - 24 General
  - 25 Professional
- 3 UPPER SECONDARY EDUCATION
  - 34 General
  - 35 Professional
- 4 POST-SECONDARY NON-TERTIARY EDUCATION
  - 44 General
  - 45 Professional
- 5 SHORT-CYCLE TERTIARY EDUCATION
  - 54 General
  - 55 Professional
- 6 BACHELOR'S OR EQUIVALENT LEVEL
  - 64 Academic
  - 65 Professional
  - 66 Orientation unspecified
- 7 MASTER'S OR EQUIVALENT LEVEL
  - 74 Academic
  - 75 Professional
  - 76 Orientation unspecified
- 8 DOCTORAL OR EQUIVALENT LEVEL
  - 84 Academic
  - 85 Professional
  - 86 Orientation unspecified

== 1997 Version ==
ISCED 1997 levels of education
Level	Label	Description
0	Pre-primary education	Initial stage of organized instruction, designed primarily to introduce very young children to a school-type environment and to develop their cognitive, physical, social and emotional skills. Designed for children from age 3 to the start of primary education.
1	Primary education or first stage of basic education	Normally starting between the ages of 5 – 7, designed to give a sound basic education in reading, writing and mathematics along with an elementary understanding of other subjects.
2	Lower secondary education or second stage of basic education	Designed to complete basic education, usually on a more subject-oriented pattern. It builds upon the learning outcomes from primary education (ISCED level 1) and aims to lay the foundation for lifelong learning and human development.
3	Upper secondary education	More specialized education typically beginning at age 15 or 16 years or completes secondary education in preparation for tertiary education, or to provide skills relevant to employment, or both.
4	Post-secondary non-tertiary education	Programmes that straddle the boundary between upper- and post-secondary education from an international point of view. ISCED level 4 programmes, considering their content, cannot be regarded as tertiary programmes. They are often not significantly more advanced than programmes at ISCED level 3 but they serve to broaden the knowledge of participants who have already completed a programme at level 3.
5	First stage of tertiary education	Tertiary programmes having an educational content more advanced than those offered at ISCED levels 3 and 4. These programmes may be academically based or practically oriented / occupationally specific. Entry to these programmes normally requires the successful completion of ISCED level 3A or 3B or a similar qualification at ISCED level 4A. All degrees and qualifications are cross-classified by type of programmes, position in national degree or qualification structures and cumulative duration at tertiary.
6	Second stage of tertiary education	Tertiary programmes leading to the award of an advanced research qualification, e.g. Ph.D. These programmes are therefore devoted to advanced study and original research and are not based on course-work only. It typically requires the submission of a thesis or dissertation of publishable quality which is the product of original research and represents a significant contribution to knowledge.

=== ISCED 1997 fields of education ===
- 0 General programmes
  - 01 Basic programmes
  - 08 Literacy and numeracy
  - 09 Personal development
- 1 Education
  - 14 Teacher training and education science
- 2 Humanities and arts
  - 21 Arts
  - 22 Humanities
- 3 Social sciences, business and law
  - 31 Social and behavioural science
  - 32 Journalism and information
  - 34 Business and administration
  - 38 Law
- 4 Science
  - 42 Life sciences
  - 44 Physical sciences
  - 46 Mathematics and statistics
  - 48 Computing
- 5 Engineering, manufacturing and construction
  - 52 Engineering and engineering trades
  - 54 Manufacturing and processing
  - 58 Architecture and building
- 6 Agriculture
  - 62 Agriculture, forestry and fishery
  - 64 Veterinary
- 7 Health and welfare
  - 72 Health
  - 76 Social services
- 8 Services
  - 81 Personal services
  - 84 Transport services
  - 85 Environmental protection
  - 86 Security services
- Not known or unspecified

== Comparison between versions ==
Key differences between ISCED 1997 and ISCED 2011
ISCED 2011	ISCED 1997
Level 0: Early childhood education (01 Early childhood educational development)	None
Level 0: Early childhood education (02 Pre-primary education)	Level 0: Pre-primary education.
Level 1: Primary education	Level 1: Primary education or first stage of basic education.
Level 2: Lower secondary education	Level 2: Lower secondary education or second stage of basic education
Level 3: Upper secondary education	Level 3: Upper secondary education
Level 4: Post-secondary non-tertiary education	Level 4: Post-secondary non-tertiary education
Level 5: Short-cycle tertiary education	Level 5B: First stage of tertiary education: typically shorter, more practical/technical/occupationally specific programmes leading to professional qualifications.
Level 6: Bachelor's or equivalent	Level 5A: First stage of tertiary education: largely theoretically based programmes intended to provide qualifications for gaining entry into more advanced research programmes and professions with higher skills requirements.
Level 7: Master's or equivalent	Level 5A: First stage of tertiary education: largely theoretically based programmes intended to provide qualifications for gaining entry into more advanced research programmes and professions with higher skills requirements.
Level 8: Doctorate or equivalent	Level 6: Second stage of tertiary education (leading to an advanced research qualification).

== See also ==
- European Qualifications Framework (EQF) for a similar European-based level system
- International Standard Classification of Occupations
- UNESCO nomenclature for fields of science and technology
