= Diploma (India) =

Education course

Diploma is a Degree course offered by various Organisations, Institutions and Universities in different states of India. The courses and syllabus are designed and approved by All India Council of Technical Education. The educational system is also called Polytechnic. Students opt for these courses after passing out from 10th or 12th schooling in India.

== History and Objective ==
Polytechnic Diploma courses in India are pursued after passing 10th or 12th as per the requirements of course. The courses which are offered in various branches are regulated by All India Council of Technical Education. The courses are offered by different states across India. Diploma in various streams offer job opportunities in varied fields. Fee structure for these courses are revised from time to time by AICTE. The courses are offered in Government and Private organisations.

== Eligibility ==
Diploma courses can be pursued by anyone with following eligibility-

- Passout of class 10 or 12th.
- Should be Indian Citizen.
- Passing in entrance exam and counselling during admission process conducted by different states.

== Benefits ==
Diploma courses offers various benefits-

- Short term.
- Lower fees.
- Fast turnaround time for job search.

== Branches ==
Diploma courses are offered in following branches in India-

- Engineering and Technology.
- Applied arts and crafts.
- Fashion Designing.
- Hotel management and Catering Technology.

== See also ==
- Education in India
