= Council of Architecture =

Professional regulatory body for architects in India

Professional council overview
- Formed: 1 September 1972; 53 years ago
- Type: Professional regulatory body
- Jurisdiction: Government of India
- Headquarters: India Habitat Centre, New Delhi
- Professional council executives: Abhay Vinayak Purohit, President; Gajanand Ram, Vice President; Raj Kumar Oberoi, Registrar; Deepak Kumar, Deputy Registrar
- Parent department: Department of Higher Education, Minister of Education
- Website: www.coa.gov.in

The Council of Architecture (COA) is a professional regulatory body established by the Government of India to regulate architectural education and profession of architects throughout India.

== Overview ==
The role of the Council of Architecture are:

- Registering architects;
- Setting minimum standards for architectural education;
- Inspecting higher educational institutions offering architectural programmes;
- Establishing a code of ethics and standards of professional conduct for architects; and
- Investigating professional misconduct.

== History ==
India experienced a rapid increase in construction activities following the independence. During this period, many unqualified persons utilised the title "architect" and undertook the construction of buildings, which were frequently uneconomical and unsafe. This caused disrepute to the profession of architects.

The Indian Institute of Architects, a professional association of architects, led the demand for statutory regulation of profession of architecture. They argued that statutory regulation was necessary to protect the general public from unqualified persons working as architects.

Subsequently, the Indian Parliament enacted the Architects Act of 1972 as a statutory provision for registering architects. The Act made it unlawful for any person to use the title "architect" without the requisite qualifications, experience and registration under the Act.

The Architects Act established the Council of Architecture with authority over the registration of architects. The Act empowered the Council of Architecture to prescribe a code of ethics and standards of professional conduct for architects and enforce it through enquiries and disciplinary actions. The Act entrusted the Council of Architecture with assessment of the standards of education and training of architects within India.

== Organisation structure ==
=== Council ===
The Council of Architecture is the primary deliberative body of the professional regulatory body. Its resolution and decision needs to be approved by the Executive Committee through a majority vote before commencement.

The Council of Architecture consists of the following members:

- Five architects elected by the members of the Indian Institute of Architects from among themselves;
- Five architects elected by the heads of architecture schools from among themselves;
- One person nominated by the Government of India;
- Two persons nominated by the All India Council for Technical Education (AICTE);
- The Chief Architect of the Indian Central Public Works Department, as an ex officio member;
- The Chief Architect of the Indian Ministry of Defence, as an ex officio member;
- One architect from each state or union territory, nominated by the respective state or union territory government;
- Two persons nominated by the Institution of Engineers (India) from among its members; and
- One person nominated by the Institution of Surveyors (India) from among its members.

The elected and nominated members of the Council of Architecture serve a three-year term from the date of their election or nomination. All members are eligible for re-election or re-nomination, but may not serve more than three consecutive terms.

=== President ===
The President is elected by the members of the Council of Architecture present at the time of the election, from among themselves. The President serves a three-year term, provided their membership in the Council of Architecture remains active.

=== Vice President ===
The Vice President is elected by the members of the Council of Architecture present at the time of the election, from among themselves. The Vice President serves a three-year term, provided their membership in the Council of Architecture remains active.

=== Registrar ===
The Registrar is appointed by the Council of Architecture as its chief executive officer. The Registrar must retire at the age of 60.

=== Executive Committee ===
The Executive Committee is the executive authority of the Council of Architecture and is responsible for giving effect to the resolution and decision of the Council of Architecture.

The Executive Committee is a seven-member committee of the Council of Architecture and is composed of the President, the Vice President, and five additional members, who are elected by the members of the Council of Architecture from among themselves. The members of the Executive Committee serves a three-year term, provided their membership in the Council of Architecture remains active.

The Executive Committee manages and invests the funds and oversees staff appointments and conditions of service. It prepares annual audit and administration reports and submits them to the Council of Architecture for consideration. It also authorizes expenditures and handles allowances. The Presidents approve the resolution and decision of the Committee by signing it. If the President disapproves, the Council of Architecture can approve it through a majority vote.

=== Disciplinary Committee ===
The Disciplinary Committee is a three-member committee of the Council of Architecture, responsible for investigating alleged professional misconduct by architects. The Council of Architecture reviews complaints made against registered architects and refers any prima facie cases to the Disciplinary Committee for a full inquiry. The Disciplinary Committee conducts the inquiry and submits its report to the Council of Architecture.
