= Outline of architecture =

Study and practice of designing structures

The following outline is an overview and topical guide to architecture:

Architecture is the study and practice of designing structures, especially habitable ones. It utilizes civil engineering techniques, but is considered a visual art. It is both the process and the product of sketching, conceiving, planning, designing, and constructing buildings or other structures. The term comes from Latin architectura; from Ancient Greek ἀρχιτέκτων (arkhitéktōn) 'architect'; from ἀρχι- (arkhi-) 'chief' and τέκτων (téktōn) 'creator'. Architectural works, in the material form of buildings, are often perceived as cultural symbols and as works of art. Historical civilizations are often identified with their surviving architectural achievements.

== What type of thing is architecture? ==
Architecture can be described as all of the following:

- Academic discipline – focused study in one academic field or profession. A discipline incorporates expertise, people, projects, communities, challenges, studies, inquiry, and research areas that are strongly associated with the given discipline.
- Buildings – buildings and similar structures, the product of architecture, are referred to as architecture.
- One of the arts – as an art form, architecture is an outlet of human expression, that is usually influenced by culture and which in turn helps to change culture. Architecture is a physical manifestation of the internal human creative impulse.
  - Fine art – in Western European academic traditions, fine art is art developed primarily for aesthetics, distinguishing it from applied art that also has to serve some practical function. The word "fine" here does not so much denote the quality of the artwork in question, but the purity of the discipline according to traditional Western European canons.
- Science – systematic enterprise that builds and organizes knowledge in the form of testable explanations and predictions about the universe. A science is a branch of science, or a discipline of science. It is a way of pursuing knowledge, not only the knowledge itself.
  - Applied science – branch of science that applies existing scientific knowledge to develop more practical applications, such as technology or inventions.

=== Definitions of architecture ===
Architecture is variously defined in conflicting ways, highlighting the difficulty of describing the scope of the subject precisely:

- A general term to describe buildings and other physical structures – although not all buildings are generally considered to be architecture, and infrastructure (bridges, roads etc.) is civil engineering, not architecture.
- The art and science, or the action and process, of designing and constructing buildings.
- The design activity of the architect, the profession of designing buildings.
- A building designed by an architect, the end product of architectural design.
- A building whose design transcends mere function, a unifying or coherent form or structure.
- The expression of thought in building.
- A group or body of buildings in a particular style.
- A particular style or way of designing buildings.

Some key quotations on the subject of architecture:

- Vitruvius: defined the essential qualities of architecture as "firmness, commodity, and delight".
- Johann Wolfgang von Goethe: "I call architecture frozen music".
- Walter Gropius: "Architecture begins where engineering ends".
- Le Corbusier: "A house is a machine for living in".
- Louis Sullivan: "... form ever follows function. This is the law", usually quoted as the architectural mantra "form follows function".
- Mies van der Rohe: "Less is more".
- Robert Venturi: "Less is a bore".

== Roles in architecture ==
Professionals involved in planning, designing, and constructing buildings include:

- Architect – a person trained in the planning, design and supervision of building construction.
  - Architectural intern – a person gaining practical experience while studying to qualify as an architect.
  - Council architect – an architect employed by a local authority.
  - Landscape architect – a person who develops land for human use and enjoyment through effective placement of structures, vehicular and pedestrian ways, and plantings.
  - Project architect – a person who is responsible for overseeing the architectural aspects of the development of the design, production of the construction documents and specifications.
  - State architect – a person who is generally responsible for the design and/or construction of public buildings in the state.
- Architectural designer – generally, a designer involved in architecture but not qualified as an architect.
- Architectural engineer
- Architectural technologist or building technologist – a professional trained in architectural technology, building design and construction, and who provides building design services.
- Building control officer or Approved Inspector
- Building inspector
- Clerk of works
- Drafter or draughtsman – a person trained in drawing up architectural drawings.
- Site manager
- Building surveyor

=== People engaged in architecture ===
- Architects
- Architecture firms
- Architectural historians
- Architecture critics

== Architectural styles ==
Architectural style – a specific way of building, characterized by the features that make it notable. A style may include such elements as form, method of construction, materials, and regional character. Influential contemporary and relatively recent styles include :

- Modern architecture – generally characterized by simplification of form and the absence of applied ornament.
- International style or international modern– the steel-and-glass culmination of Modernism.
- Brutalism – the use of raw concrete and massive uncompromising forms.
- Postmodern architecture – has been described as the return of "wit, ornament and reference" to architecture in response to the formalism of the International Style of modernism.
- Deconstructivism – based on the more general theory of deconstruction, a design style characterized by fragmentation, distortion and dislocation of structure and envelope.

=== Specialist subclassifications of architecture ===
Terms used to describe different architectural concerns, origins and objectives.

- Architecture parlante ("speaking architecture") – buildings or architectural elements that explain their own function or identity by means of an inscription or literal representation.
- Religious architecture – the design and construction of places of worship.
- Responsive architecture – designing buildings that measure their environmental conditions (via sensors) to adapt their form, shape, color or character responsively (via actuators).
- Sustainable architecture – environmentally conscious design techniques in the field of architecture.
- Vernacular architecture – traditional local building styles, typically not designed by professional architects although vernacular elements are adopted by many architects.

== Architectural theory ==
- Architectural design values – the various values that influence architects and designers in making design decisions.
- Mathematics and architecture – have always been close, because architecture relies upon mathematical precision, and because both fields share a search for order and beauty.
- Pattern language – a term coined by architect Christopher Alexander, a structured method of describing good design practices within a field of expertise.
- Proportion – the relationship between elements and the whole.
- Space syntax – a set of theories and techniques for the analysis of spatial configurations.
- Architecture criticism – published or broadcast critique, assessing the architect's success in meeting his own aims and objectives and those of others.

=== Architectural terms ===
- Glossary of architecture

== Regional architecture ==
=== Architecture of Africa ===
Architecture of Africa

- Architecture of Algeria
- Architecture of Angola
- Ancient Egyptian architecture
- Architecture of Cape Verde
- Architecture of Ethiopia
- Architecture of Ghana
- Architecture of Madagascar
- Architecture of Mali
- Architecture of Morocco
  - Architecture of Casablanca
  - Architecture of Fez
  - Architecture of Marrakesh
- Architecture of Nigeria
  - Architecture of Lagos
- Architecture of Somalia
- Architecture of South Africa
  - Architecture of Johannesburg
  - Cape Dutch architecture
- Architecture of Zimbabwe

=== Architecture of Asia ===
Architecture of Asia

- Architecture of Afghanistan
- Armenian architecture
- Architecture of Azerbaijan
  - Architecture of Baku
- Architecture of Bahrain
- Architecture of Bangladesh
- Architecture of Bhutan
  - Dzong architecture
- Architecture of Cambodia
- Architecture of China
  - Architecture of Hong Kong
- Architecture of Cyprus
- Architecture of Georgia (country)
- Architecture of India
  - Architecture of Bengal
  - Architecture of Gujarat
  - Architecture of Karnataka
  - Architecture of Kerala
  - Architecture of Maharashtra
  - Architecture of Rajasthan
  - Architecture of Tamil Nadu
  - Architecture of Uttar Pradesh
  - Architecture of Telangana
- Architecture of Indonesia
  - Architecture of Sumatra
  - Balinese architecture
- Architecture of Iran
  - Architecture of Tehran
- Architecture of Israel
- Architecture of Japan
  - Architecture of Tokyo
  - Okinawan architecture
- Architecture of Jordan
- Architecture of Korea
  - Architecture of North Korea
  - Architecture of South Korea
- Architecture of Kuwait
- Architecture of Lebanon
- Architecture of Macau
- Architecture of Malaysia
  - Architecture of Kuala Lumpur
  - Architecture of Penang
- Architecture of Mongolia
- Architecture of Myanmar
- Architecture of Nepal
  - Architecture of Kathmandu
- Architecture of Pakistan
- Architecture of the Philippines
- Architecture of Russia
- Architecture of Saudi Arabia
- Architecture of Singapore
- Architecture of Sri Lanka
- Architecture of Taiwan
- Architecture of Thailand
- Architecture of Tibet
- Architecture of Turkey
- Architecture of the United Arab Emirates
- Architecture of Uzbekistan
- Architecture of Vietnam
- Architecture of Yemen

=== Architecture of Europe ===
Architecture of Europe

- Architecture of Albania
- Architecture of Austria
- Architecture of Azerbaijan
- Architecture of Belgium
- Architecture of Bosnia and Herzegovina
  - Architecture of Mostar
- Architecture of Bulgaria
- Architecture of Croatia
- Architecture of the Czech Republic
- Architecture of Denmark
  - Architecture of Aarhus
  - Architecture in Copenhagen
- Architecture of Estonia
- Architecture of Finland
- Architecture of France
  - Architecture of Normandy
  - Architecture of Paris
    - Architecture of the Paris Métro
    - Paris architecture of the Belle Époque
  - Architecture of Provence
- Architecture of Georgia (country)
- Architecture of Germany
  - Architecture of Berlin
  - Architecture of Munich
- Architecture of Greece
  - Modern architecture in Athens
- Architecture of Hungary
- Architecture of Iceland
- Architecture of Ireland
  - Architecture of Letterkenny
  - Architecture of Limerick
- Architecture of Italy
  - Architecture of Rome
  - Italian modern and contemporary architecture
- Architecture of Lithuania
- Architecture of Luxembourg
- Architecture of Malta
- Architecture of Moldova
- Architecture of Monaco
- Architecture of Montenegro
- Architecture of the Netherlands
- Architecture of North Macedonia
- Architecture of Norway
- Architecture of Poland
  - Architecture of Warsaw
- Architecture of Portugal
- Architecture of Romania
- Architecture of Russia
- Architecture of Serbia
  - Architecture of Belgrade
- Architecture of Slovenia
- Architecture of Spain
  - Architecture of Barcelona
  - Architecture of Madrid
- Architecture of Sweden
  - Architecture of Stockholm
- Architecture of Switzerland
- Architecture of Turkey
  - Architecture of Istanbul
- Architecture of Ukraine
- Architecture of the United Kingdom
  - Architecture of England
    - Architecture of Aylesbury
    - Architecture of Birmingham
    - Architecture of Leeds
    - Architecture of Liverpool
    - Architecture of London
      - Architecture of the London Borough of Croydon
    - Architecture of Manchester
    - Buildings and architecture of Bath
  - Architecture of Scotland
    - Architecture of Aberdeen
    - Architecture of Glasgow
  - Architecture of Ireland
  - Architecture of Wales
    - Architecture of Cardiff
- Architecture of Vatican City

==== Dependencies, autonomies, and other territories ====
- Architecture of Gibraltar
- Architecture of Kosovo
  - Architecture of Peć

=== Architecture of North America ===
- Architecture of Antigua and Barbuda
- Architecture of the Bahamas
- Architecture of Barbados
- Architecture of Belize
- Architecture of Canada
  - Architecture of Montreal
  - Architecture of Ottawa
  - Architecture of Quebec City
  - Architecture of St. John's
  - Architecture of Toronto
  - Architecture of Vancouver
- Architecture of Costa Rica
- Architecture of Cuba
  - Architecture of Havana
- Architecture of Dominica
- Architecture of the Dominican Republic
- Architecture of El Salvador
- Architecture of Grenada
- Architecture of Guatemala
- Architecture of Haiti
- Architecture of Honduras
- Architecture of Jamaica
- Architecture of Mexico
- Architecture of Nicaragua
- Architecture of Panama
  - Architecture of Panama City
- Architecture of Puerto Rico
- Architecture of Saint Kitts and Nevis
- Architecture of Saint Lucia
- Architecture of Saint Vincent and the Grenadines
- Architecture of Trinidad and Tobago
- Architecture of the United States
  - Architecture of Albany, New York
  - Buildings and architecture of Allentown, Pennsylvania
  - Architecture of Atlanta
  - Architecture of Buffalo, New York
  - Architecture of Chicago
  - Architecture of metropolitan Detroit
  - Architecture of Fredericksburg, Texas
  - Architecture of Houston
  - Architecture of Jacksonville
  - Architecture of Kansas City
  - Architecture of Las Vegas
  - Architecture of Los Angeles
  - Architecture of Miami
  - Buildings and architecture of New Orleans
  - Architecture of New York City
  - Architecture in Omaha, Nebraska
  - Architecture of Philadelphia
  - Architecture of Plymouth, Pennsylvania
  - Architecture of Portland, Oregon
  - Architecture of San Antonio
  - Architecture of San Francisco
  - Architecture of Seattle
  - Architecture of St. Louis

==== Dependencies and other territories ====
- Architecture of Anguilla
- Architecture of Aruba
- Architecture of Bermuda
- Architecture of the British Virgin Islands
- Architecture of the Cayman Islands
- Architecture of Greenland
- Architecture of Guadeloupe
- Architecture of Martinique
- Architecture of Montserrat
- Architecture of Navassa Island
- Architecture of the Netherlands Antilles
- Architecture of Saint Barthélemy
- Architecture of Saint Pierre and Miquelon
- Architecture of the Turks and Caicos Islands
- Architecture of the United States Virgin Islands

=== Architecture of Oceania ===
Architecture of Oceania

- Australia
  - Architecture of Australia
    - Architecture of Bathurst, New South Wales
    - Architecture of Melbourne
    - Architecture of Sydney
- Melanesia
  - Architecture of Fiji
- Micronesia
- Polynesia
  - Architecture of New Zealand
  - Architecture of Samoa

=== Architecture of South America ===
Architecture of South America

- Architecture of Argentina
- Architecture of Bolivia
- Architecture of Brazil
- Architecture of Chile
- Architecture of Colombia
- Architecture of Panama
- Architecture of Paraguay
- Architecture of Peru
- Architecture of Trinidad and Tobago

==== Territories ====
- Architecture of Aruba
- Architecture of the Falkland Islands

== History of architecture ==
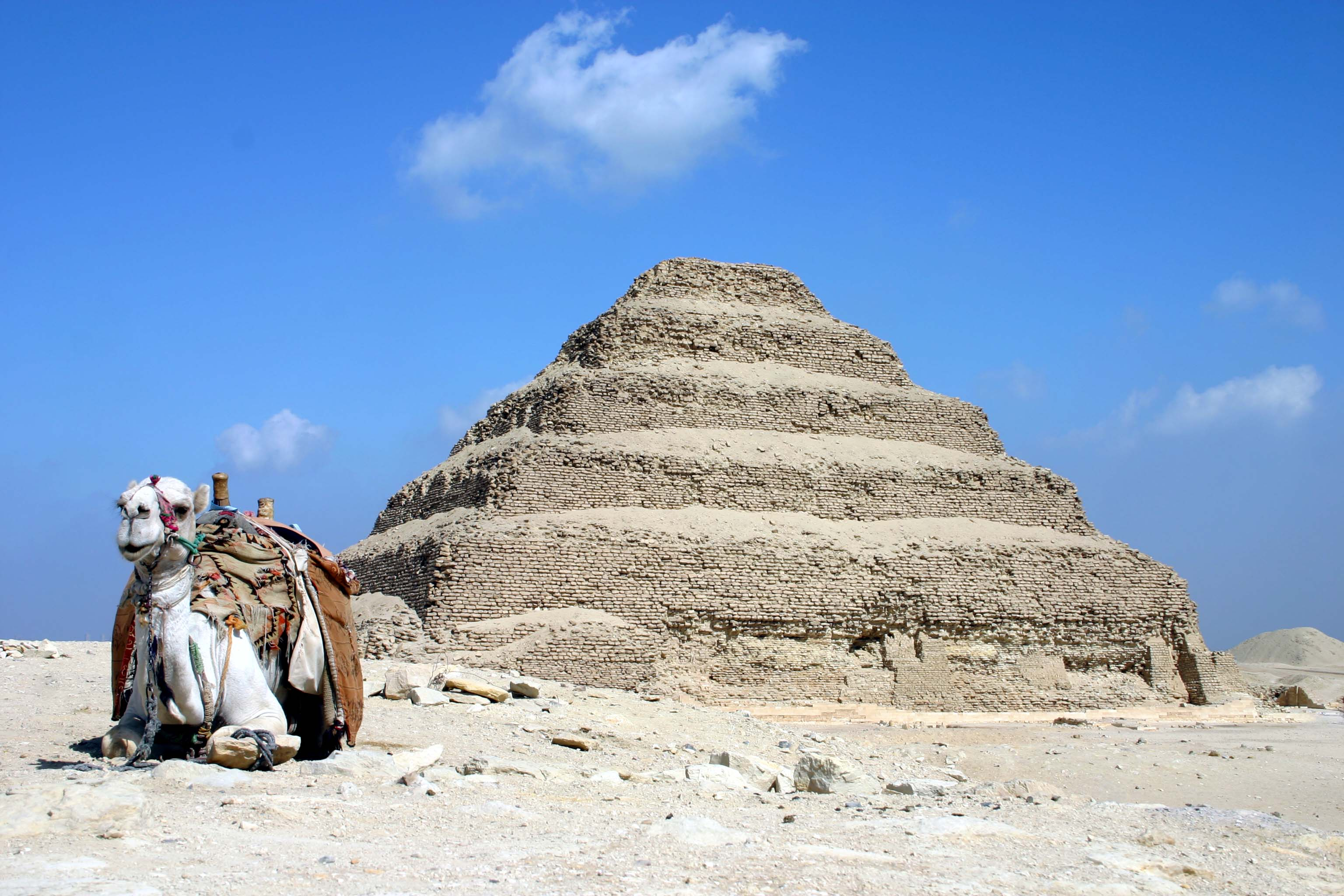
Pyramid of Djoser, a step pyramid built during the 27th century BC.

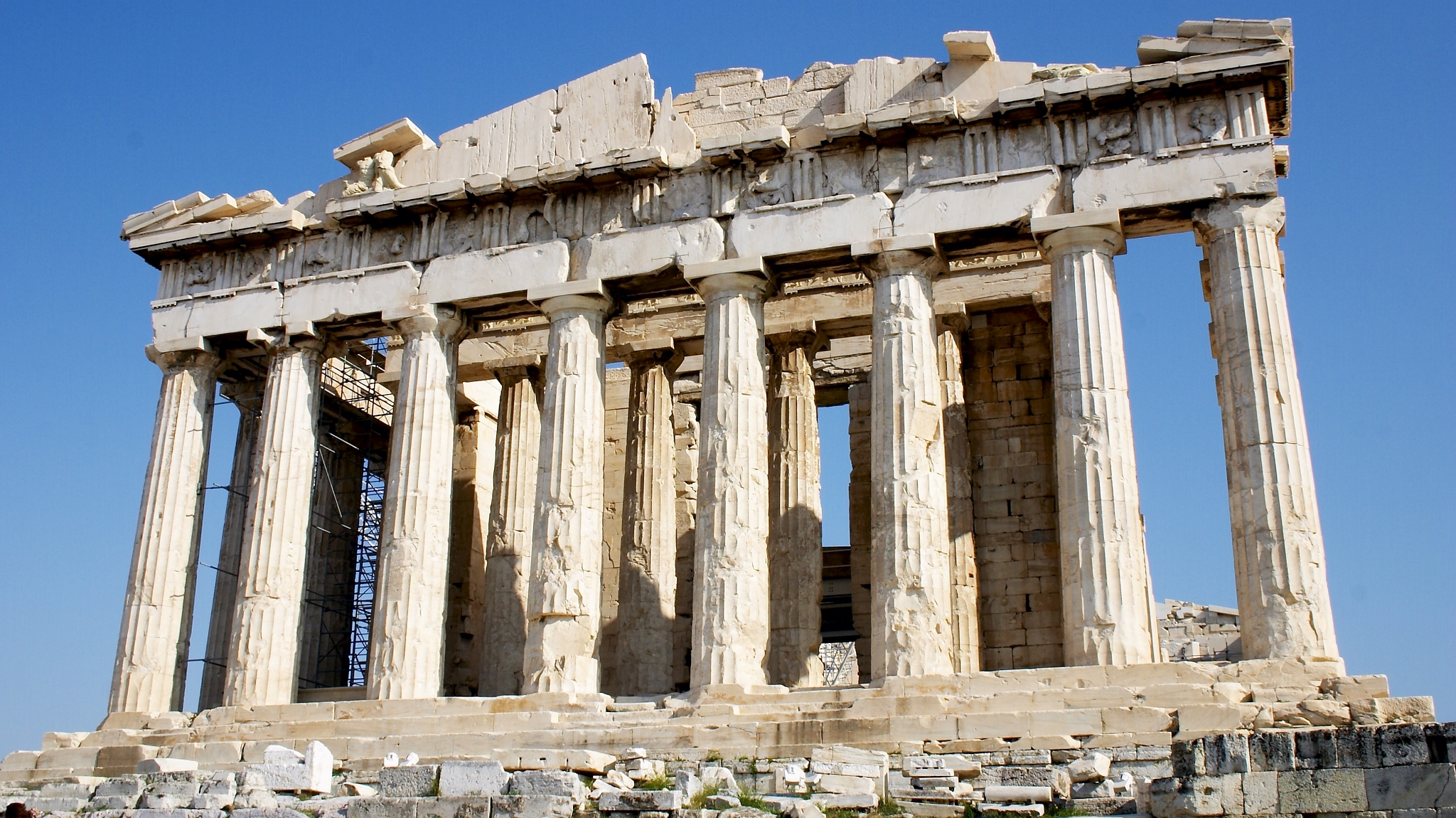
The Parthenon in Athens is considered the pinnacle of ancient Greek architecture.

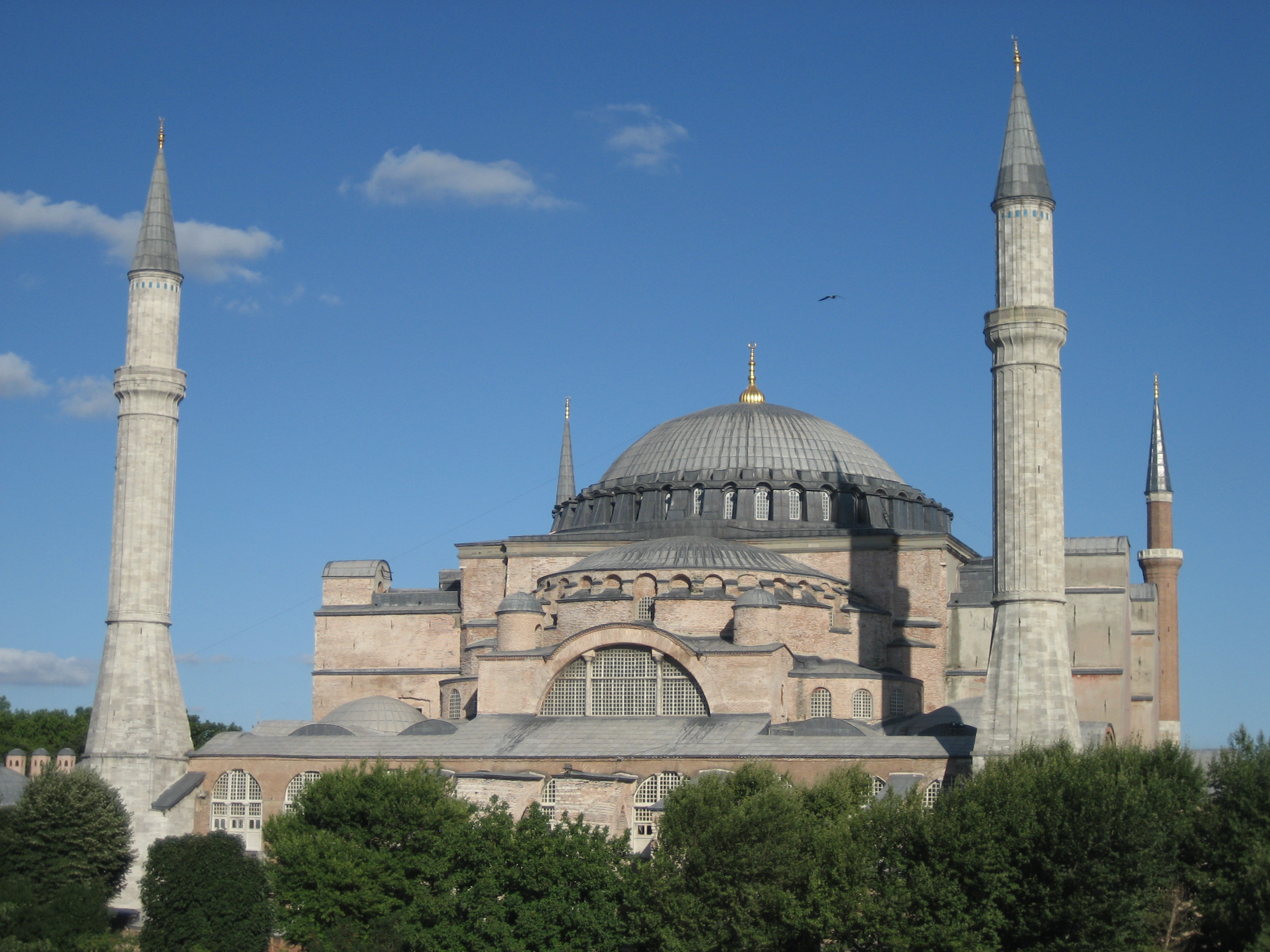
The Hagia Sophia, dating from 532AD, is one of the most famous examples of Byzantine architecture.

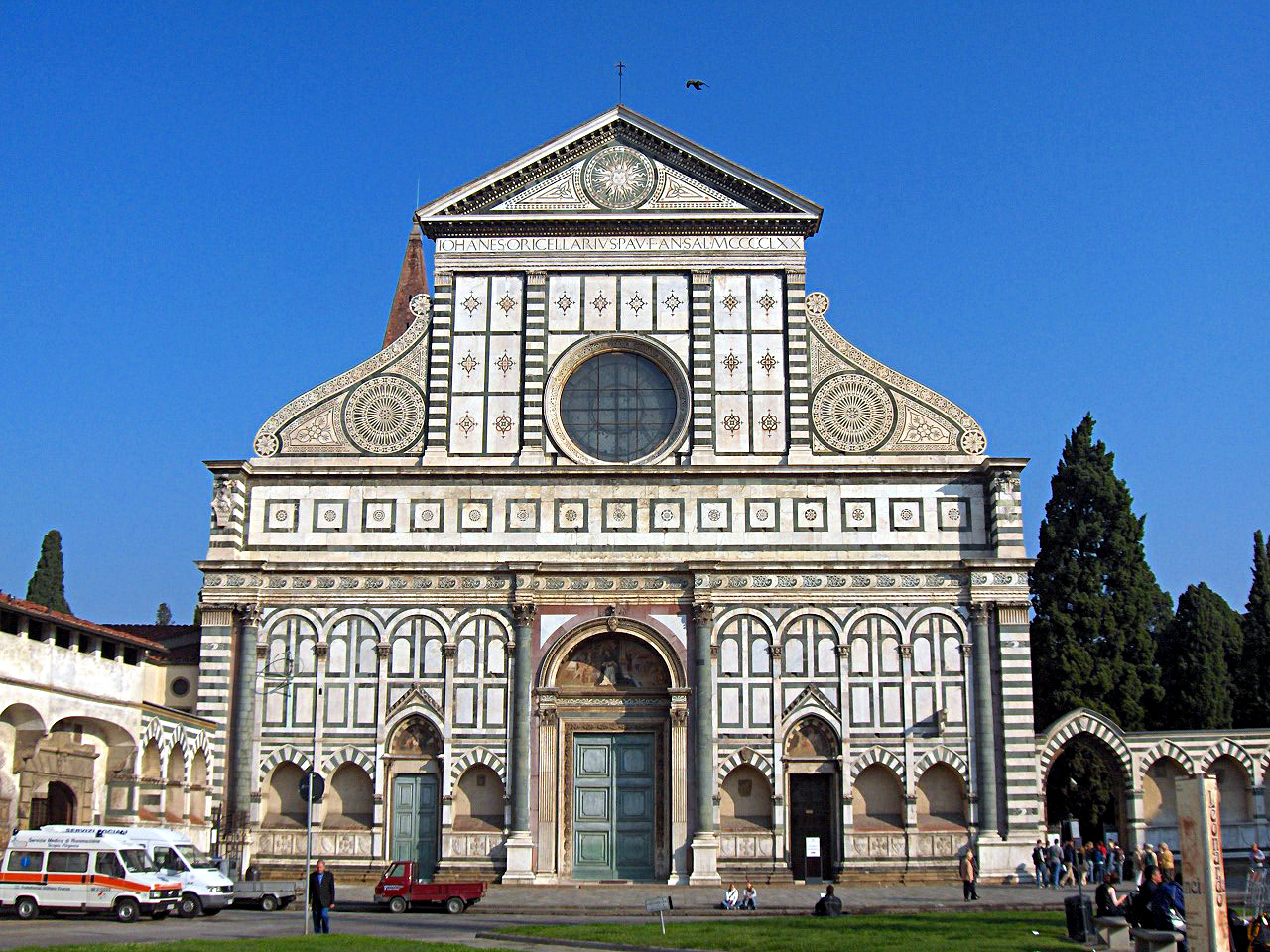
Renaissance façade of Santa Maria Novella in Florence.

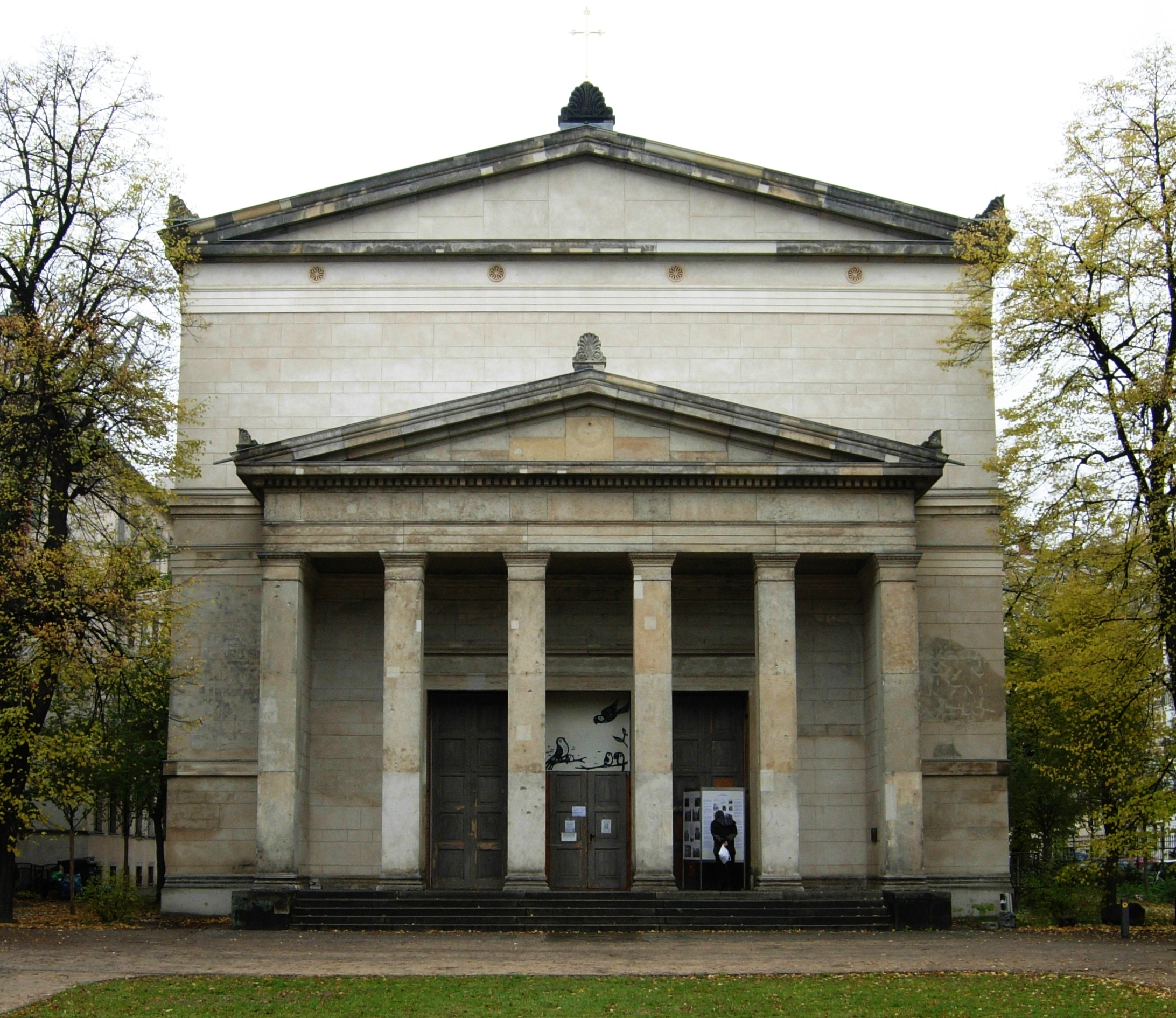
Restrained neoclassical style: the Elisabethkirche in Berlin.

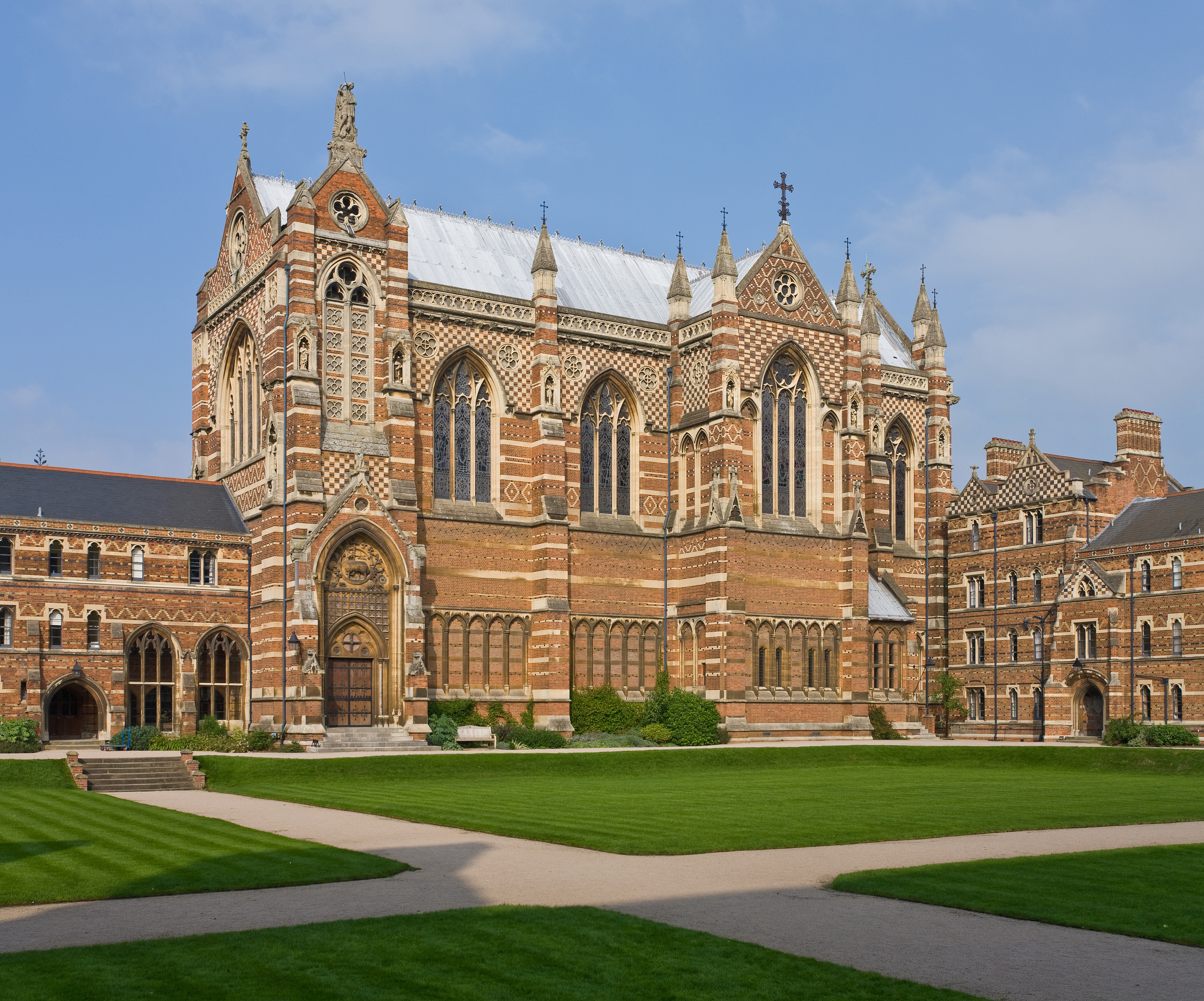
Keble College Chapel in Oxford, built in a gothic revival style.

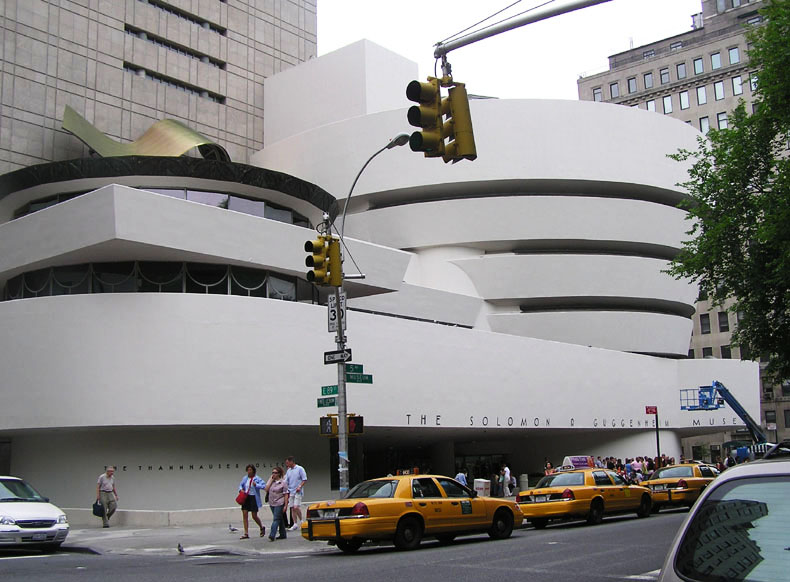
Solomon R. Guggenheim Museum in New York, by Frank Lloyd Wright.

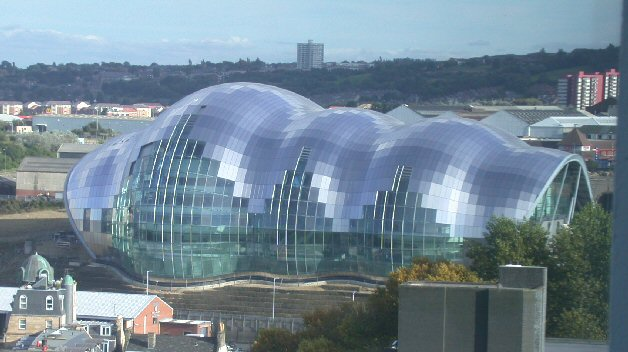
The Sage, Gateshead by Norman Foster: the trend towards organic shapes in contemporary architecture.

Burj Khalifa, Dubai: the tallest skyscraper in the world, completed in 2009.

- Neolithic architecture – architecture of the last part of the Stone Age, and of the people of the Americas and the Pacific up until the time of European contact.
- Ancient Egyptian architecture – architecture of ancient Egypt, which developed a vast array of diverse structures and great architectural monuments along the Nile, among the largest and most famous of which are the Great Pyramid of Giza and the Great Sphinx of Giza.
- Achaemenid architecture – the architectural achievements of the Achaemenid Persians manifesting in construction of complex cities (Perspepolis, Susa, Ecbatana), temples made for worship and social gatherings (such as Zoroastrian temples), and mausoleums erected in honor of fallen kings (such as the burial tomb of Cyrus the Great).
- Armenian architecture – an architectural style developed over the last 4,500 years of human habitation in the Armenian Highland (the eastern part of Asia Minor) and used principally by the Armenian people.
- Coptic architecture – the architecture of the Copts, who form the majority of Christians in Egypt.
- Dravidian architecture – a style of architecture thousands of years ago in the Southern part of the Indian subcontinent or South India, built by the Dravidian peoples.
- Maya architecture – the structures of the Maya civilization, which was established circa 2000 BC and continued until its conquest by the Spanish (in the 16th and 17th centuries). Some of its notable constructions include ceremonial platforms, palaces, E-Groups, pyramids, temples, observatories, and ballcourts.
- Sumerian architecture – the ancient architecture of the region of the Tigris–Euphrates river system (also known as Mesopotamia).
- Ancient Greek architecture – the architecture of ancient Greece, where the classical orders were developed, establishing a precedent for the subsequent development of classical architecture.
- Ancient Roman architecture – adopted the principles of ancient Greek architecture and developed both new decorative forms, and much more complex building forms, notably adopting the use of arches and vaults.
- Buddhist architecture – developed by the worshipers of Buddha in South Asia in the 3rd century BCE, and associated with three types of structures: monasteries (viharas), stupas, and temples (Chaitya grihas).
- Inca architecture – the pre-Columbian architecture of the Incas in South America, known particularly for its exceptionally precise masonry.
- Sassanid architecture – the Persian architectural style that reached a peak in its development during the Sassanid era.
- Mesoamerican architecture – the set of architectural traditions produced by pre-Columbian cultures and civilizations of Mesoamerica, best known in the form of public, ceremonial and urban monumental buildings and structures.
- Byzantine architecture – the architecture of the Byzantine Empire.
- Islamic architecture – encompasses a wide range of both secular and religious styles from the foundation of Islam to the present day, influencing the design and construction of buildings and structures in Islamic culture.
- Newa architecture – style of architecture used by the Newari people in the Kathmandu valley in Nepal, ranging from stupas and chaitya monastery buildings to courtyard structures and distinctive houses.
- Medieval architecture – a term used to represent various forms of architecture common in medieval Europe.
  - Romanesque architecture – an architectural style of medieval Europe characterized by semi-circular arches.
  - Gothic architecture – a style of architecture that flourished during the high and late medieval period.
- Iranian architecture – or Persian architecture is the historic architecture of Iran (Persia).
- Hoysala architecture – building style developed under the rule of the Hoysala Empire between the 11th and 14th centuries, in the region known today as Karnataka, a state of India.
- Vijayanagara Architecture – primarily a temple style found in Vijayanagara principality in India.
- Ottoman architecture – or Turkish architecture is the architecture of the Ottoman Empire which emerged in Bursa and Edirne in 14th and 15th centuries.
- Renaissance architecture – the architecture of the period between the early 15th and early 17th centuries in different regions of Europe, demonstrating a conscious revival and development of certain elements of ancient Greek and Roman thought and material culture.
  - Classical architecture – architecture derived in part from the Greek and Roman architecture of classical antiquity, enriched by classicizing architectural practice in Europe since the Renaissance.
  - Palladian architecture – a European architectural style derived from and inspired by the designs of the Venetian architect Andrea Palladio (1508–1580).
- Baroque architecture – the building style of the Baroque era, begun in late sixteenth century Italy, that took the Roman vocabulary of Renaissance architecture and used it in a new rhetorical and theatrical fashion, often to express the triumph of the Catholic Church and the absolutist state.
- Neoclassical architecture – an architectural style produced by the neoclassical movement which began in the mid-18th century, manifested both in its details as a reaction against the Rococo style of naturalistic ornament, and in its architectural formulas as an outgrowth of some classicizing features of Late Baroque.
- Victorian architecture – includes several architectural styles employed predominantly during the middle and late 19th century.
- Renaissance Revival architecture – nineteenth century revival style inspired by buildings of the Renaissance.
- Gothic Revival architecture – also called "Victorian Gothic" and "Neo-Gothic", an architectural movement that began in the late 1840s in England. Its popularity grew rapidly in the early 19th century, when increasingly serious and learned admirers of neo-Gothic styles sought to revive medieval forms, in contrast to the neoclassical styles prevalent at the time.
- Modern architecture – generally characterized by simplification of form and absence of ornament. Although now historical, the ubiquitous international style which predominates in cities worldwide remains a strong influence in contemporary architecture.
- Postmodern architecture – began as an international style the first examples of which are generally cited as being from the 1950s, but did not become a movement until the late 1970s and continues to influence present-day architecture.
- New Classical architecture – a movement for reapproaching traditional architecture language, that established since the 1980s.
- Contemporary architecture – the architecture of the 21st century.

== Buildings ==
Although not all buildings are architecture, the term encompasses a huge range of building types, as summarised in the following list pages:

- List of building types
- List of buildings and structures
- List of human habitation forms

== Building construction ==
- Building design

=== Materials ===
- Materiality (architecture)
- Building material
- List of building materials

=== Structural elements ===
- Arch – a curved structure, often made up blocks or bricks, spanning across an opening and supporting the weight of structure above. Works by transferring vertical loads into compression forces. There are many arch shapes including semicircular, segmental, parabolic, pointed (gothic), three-point and flat arches.
- Beam (structure) – a straight structural member, typically wood or steel, capable of spanning from one support to another and supporting the weight of structure above. Works by resisting bending forces.
- Buttress – a short section of masonry built at right angles to a wall, to resist lateral forces.
- Cantilever – a projecting structure without visible means of support at the projecting end.
- Column or pillar – a relatively slender structural element, typically circular, square or polygonal in plan, that bears the weight of the structure above.
- Dome – a roof structure, typically hemispherical, constructed in a similar way to an arch. The plan shape may be circular, elliptical or polygonal, and the cross section shape can vary in the same ways as an arch.
- Doorway – opening in a wall, typically rectangular, providing means of access, usually with a gate or door to provide security and weather protection.
- Facade – an exterior face of a building, especially the front.
- Floor – typically a horizontal surface that is walked upon, to support the expected loads of the building.
- Foundation or footing – solid base usually below ground, upon which buildings and other structures are built. Works by spreading vertical loads over a sufficient area to ensure the structure will not subside.
- Lintel – a structural member spanning across the top of an opening. Unlike a beam, a lintel spans a relatively short distance which can be spanned by single block of stone of sufficient depth. Concrete, timber and steel lintels are also used in different types of construction.
- Pier (architecture) – loadbearing structure similar to a column, but more massive.
- Truss – a structure spanning in the same way as a beam, but using materials more efficiently by using triangulation to create a rigid structure. Typically timber or steel, used to support a pitched roof.
- Vault (architecture) – a curved masonry structure spanning in the same way as an arch, forming either a roof or support for a floor above.
- Wall – a linear structure enclosing the exterior of an area or building, or subdividing an internal space. A wall may be loadbearing or non-loadbearing.
- Window – an opening in a wall, typically rectangular, providing light and ventilation. Usually but not always glazed.

== Architectural education ==
Professional requirements for architects – Students undertake specific vocational training in order to qualify as a professional architects. Training typically consists of one or more university degrees and a period of practical experience. In some countries, it is illegal to use the title architect without accredited qualifications. In the United Kingdom the Architects Registration Board exists solely to regulate membership of the profession. In the United States the National Architectural Accrediting Board regulates professional educational programs and the National Council of Architectural Registration Boards is an umbrella organization to recommend model laws, regulations, exams, and to facilitate reciprocity in licensure between different jurisdictions. Architectural education can involve degree types that do not directly result in licensing, such as Bachelor of Science in architecture, Bachelor of Arts in architecture, or a research PhD in architecture. Some of the qualifications specific to architectural licensing include:

- Bachelor of Architecture (B.Arch.) – undergraduate academic degree designed to satisfy the academic component of professional accreditation bodies, to be followed by a period of practical training prior to professional examination and registration.
- Master of Architecture (M.Arch.) – professional degree in architecture, qualifying the graduate to move through the various stages of professional accreditation (internship, exams) that result in receiving a license.
- Doctor of Architecture (D.Arch) – doctoral degree in the field of architecture, that can be completed after either a Bachelor of Architecture (B.Arch), Master of Architecture (M.Arch) degree or, in some cases, another degree.

== Architectural practice ==
- Architectural drawing or architect's drawing - a technical drawing of a building or building project.
- Architectural design competition - a specialist competition inviting architects to submit design proposals for a project.
- Architectural technology or building technology - is the application of technology to the design of buildings. It is a component of architecture and building engineering and is sometimes viewed as a distinct discipline or sub-category.
- Blueprint - an obsolete paper-based method of reproducing technical drawings producing a distinctive appearance, white lines on a blue background. The word is still in use as a by-word for a design solution ("a blueprint for future developments").
- Brief (architecture) - a written statement of a client's requirements for a building project.
- Building code or building control - a set of rules that specify the minimum acceptable level of safety and environmental performance in building construction.
- Computer-aided architectural design (CAAD) - software based production of technical drawings and 3-d models
- Construction law - a branch of law that deals with matters relating to building construction.
- Cost accounting or cost management - a vital activity in connection with building, generally performed by a specialist quantity surveyor. Construction projects are notoriously subject to cost overruns, caused by changing circumstances or by failure to fully allow for foreseeable costs during budgeting.
- Project management - the process of managing all the activities involved in a construction project, including adherence to the design and local legislation, costs and payment, and verification of project completion.

== Architecture prizes ==
Architecture prize – Architecture prizes are generally awarded for completed projects and are chosen from publicised or nominated works, not from submissions by the originating architect. The RIBA Royal Gold Medal has in fact been refused on a number of occasions.

- Aga Khan Award for Architecture (AKAA) – an architectural prize established by Aga Khan IV in 1977, awarded for achievements in design and planning in Islamic societies.
- AIA Gold Medal – awarded by the American Institute of Architects for a significant body of work 'of lasting influence on the theory and practice of architecture', first awarded 1907.
- European Union Prize for Contemporary Architecture, also known as the Mies van der Rohe Award – awarded jointly by the European Union and the Fundacia Mies van der Rohe, Barcelona, 'to acknowledge and reward quality architectural production in Europe'.
- Pritzker Architecture Prize – awarded annually to "a living architect whose built work demonstrates a combination of those qualities of talent, vision and commitment, which has produced consistent and significant contributions to humanity and the built environment through the art of architecture". Founded in 1979 by Jay A. Pritzker and his wife Cindy, the award is often referred to as the Nobel Prize of architecture.
- RIBA Royal Gold Medal – awarded annually since 1848 by the Royal Institute of British Architects for an individual's or group's substantial contribution to international architecture. It is given for a distinguished body of work rather than for one building.
- Carbuncle Cup – unlike the mainstream awards which reward perceived merit, this is awarded annually by the UK magazine Building Design to 'the ugliest building in the United Kingdom completed in the last 12 months'.

more...

== Related fields ==
- Architectural conservation – repair and restoration of buildings, especially historic structures.
- Architectural technology – the application of technology to the design of buildings.
- Construction – the process of creating physical structures.
- Building construction – construction specific to buildings.
- Civil engineering – the design, construction and maintenance of the physical environment e.g. bridges, canals, dams, drainage systems and roads etc.
- Building services engineering – the design of heating, ventilation and cooling and other mechanical systems, electrical power and lighting.
- Structural engineering – the analysis and design of structures that support or resist loads.
- Sustainable design – provides expertise in improving the environmental performance of buildings.
- Interior design – the design of interior finishes and fittings.
- Urban design and urban planning (urban, city, and town planning) – a technical and legal process concerned with controlling the design of structures and the use of land.
- Virtual reality – technology used to simulate a virtual world

== See also ==
- Architectural glossary
- Index of architecture articles
- Table of years in architecture
- Timeline of architecture
