= Architecture of Bathurst, New South Wales =

Architecture in Bathurst, a regional city in the state of New South Wales, Australia includes a unique collection of architecture. This architecture reflects Bathurst's history from colonial through to recent times, with many examples remaining intact. Historical buildings range from workers cottages, terrace houses, mansions, slab huts, industrial, commercial buildings and grand civic structures.

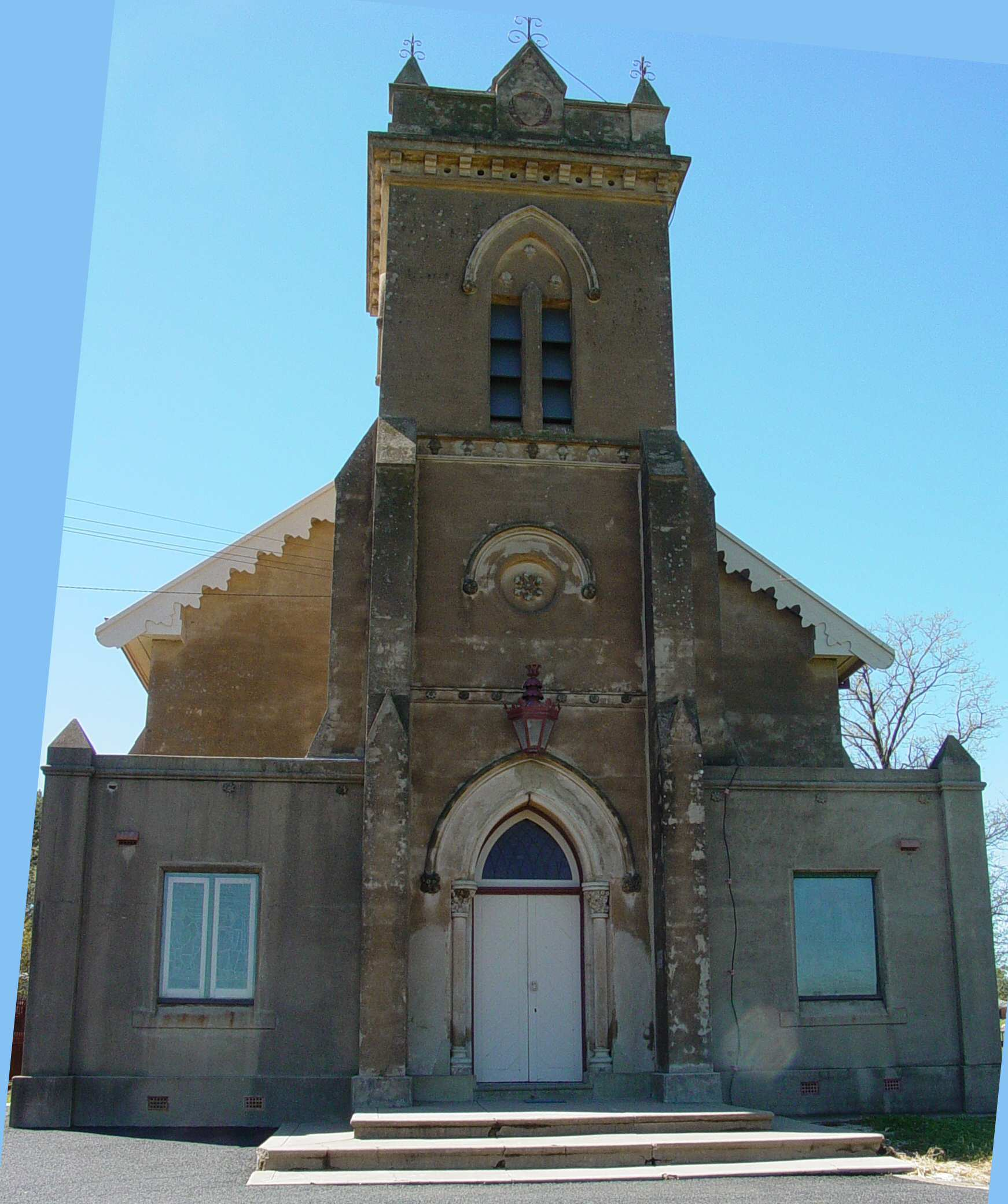
Holy Trinity Church, Kelso, built 1834.

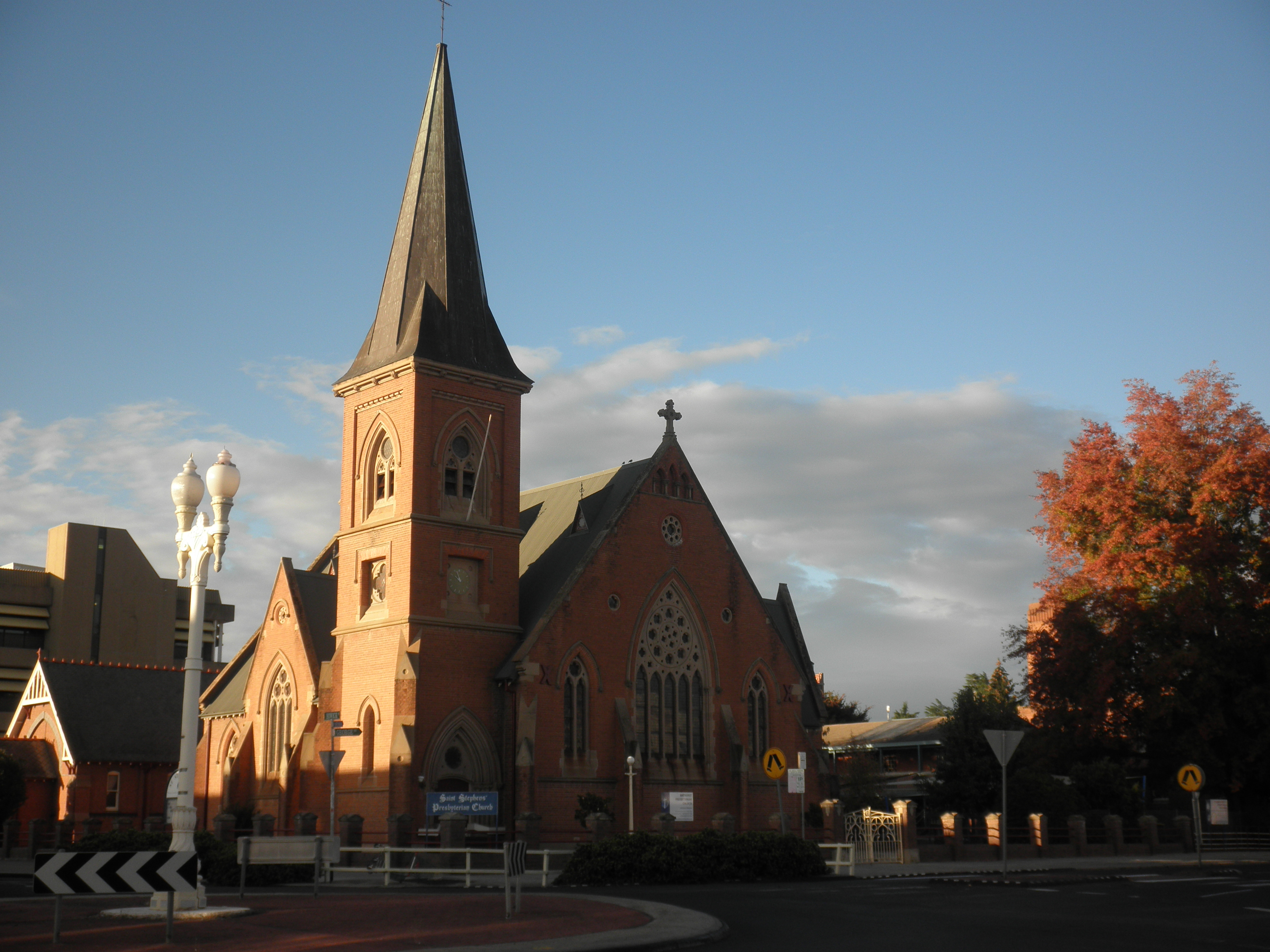
St Stephen's Church, built 1872.

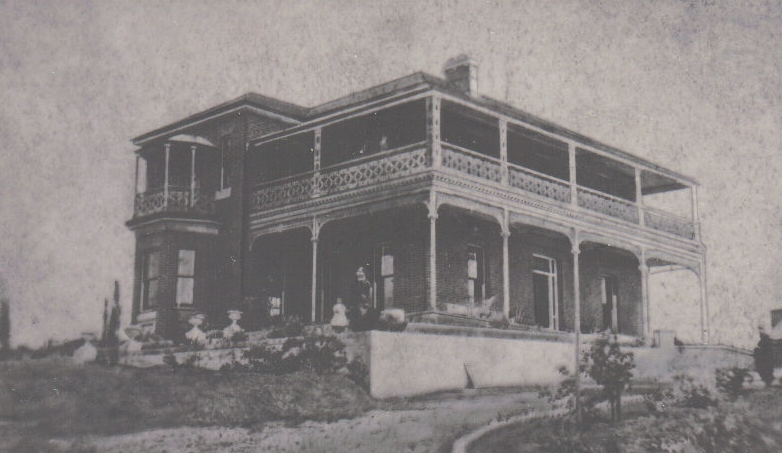
Historical image of 'Delawarr' Bathurst NSW

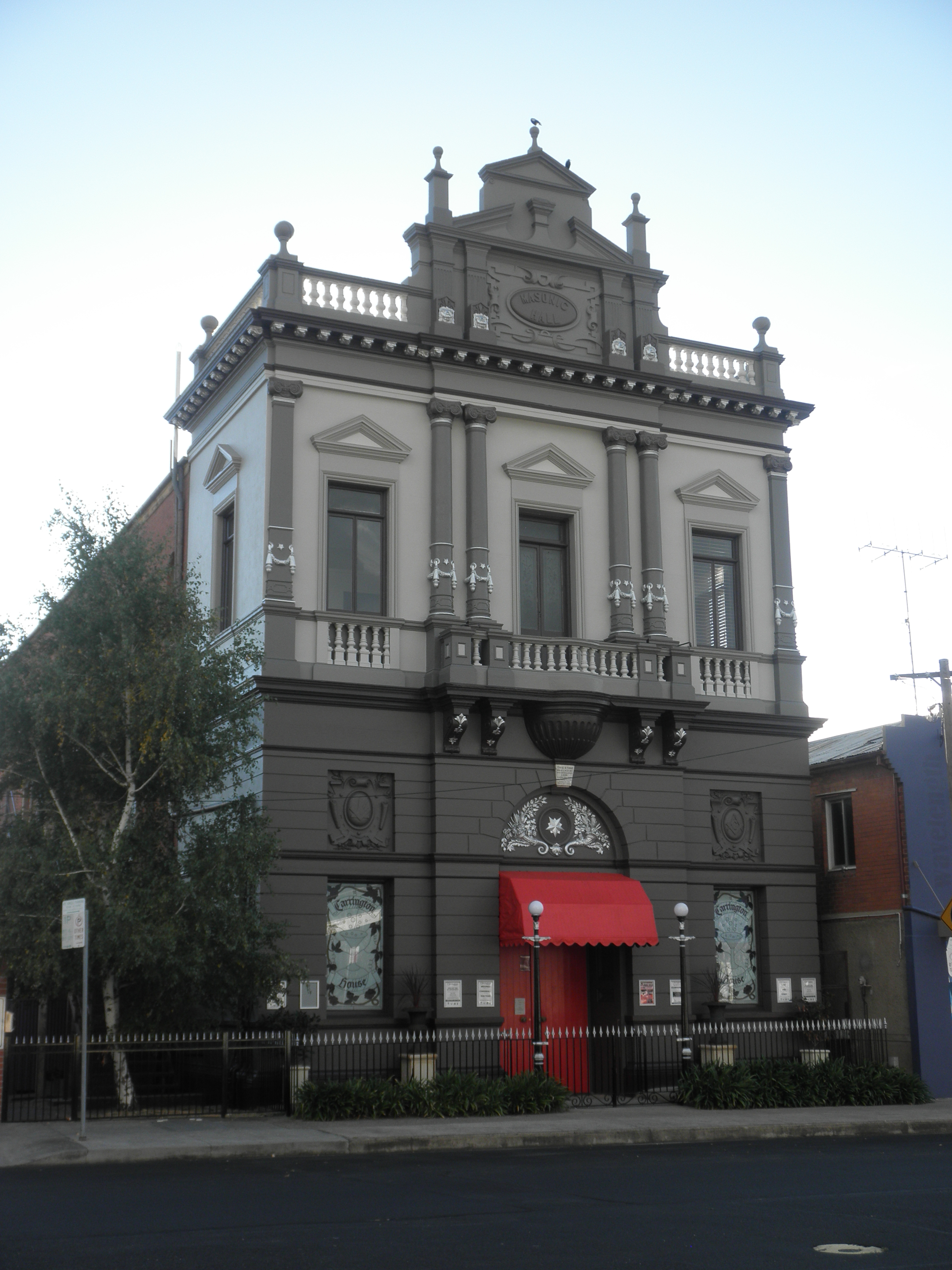
Italianate style stuccoed and decorated surfaces on the façade of the former Masonic Hall, built 1889.

== Colonial ==
Covering the period from 1815 to 1840, this Old Colonial period is mostly of Bathurst red brick, sometimes limewashed, with 12-paned windows and four- or six-panelled doors. Examples of this style include Old Government House (c. 1820), and Holy Trinity Church (Gothic style).

== Early Victorian ==
During the Early Victorian period from 1840 to 1860 the structures are mostly small domestic buildings. Characteristics of this style has the building line right up close to the street or the front verandah directly on the street. An example of this style include 'Loxsley' a gentlemen's townhouse of the period, and the Royal Hotel originally a single storey building.

== Mid Victorian ==
The Mid Victorian period from 1860 to 1880 coincides with greater affluence and more building materials becoming available such as glass. Windows typically now became 4 or 6 panes. Row housing is still a common layout, sometimes in a Gothic influenced style with steeply pitched roofs. An example of this style is the Webb Building built in 1862. During this period, Edward Gell designed many of the main buildings including the ornate St. Stanislaus' College, the railway station (1875) of the Victorian Tudor style with dutch gables topped by finials, bay windows and cast-iron verandah, and a great baronial mansion now known as Abercrombie House, a large, three-storey, 40-room mansion in the Scottish baronial style. Bathurst Hospital is a large Victorian era hospital complex in the second empire style, constructed of Bathurst red bricks, verandahs are decorated with timber posts, arched brackets and cast iron balustrades.

Many Bathurst mansions were built of the Italianate style in this period, with features such as bay windows, cast iron columns, lacework and verandahs. These include 'Woolstone' (1883), 'Logan Brae' (1877 and now a convent) and 'Delawarr' (pronounced Delaware) (1875).

Bathurst's Courthouse (1880) designed by colonial architect James Barnet stands in a prominent city position and is neo-classical style with octagonal Renaissance dome, a doric portico with pediment, octagonal tower with turret, stone facings and brick pilasters, a colonnade of Doric pillars, a sage-green roof, red bricks, yellow bricks and long lines of sash windows. Barnet also designed the Bathurst Police barracks (c. 1875) and the Bathurst Gaol (c. 1888) with the ornate lions head holding a key (a Victorian symbol of secure and certain retribution) standing over the gateway entrance.

St Stephen's Presbyterian Church is a Gothic structure built of Bathurst red bricks in 1871–72.

== Late Victorian ==
During the Late Victorian period from 1880 to 1900, the Bathurst Showground Buildings (c. 1880s) represent one of the most intact groups of nineteenth century timber showground pavilions in New South Wales. The style is known as Carpenter Gothic. The old technical college is a two-storey American Romanesque building erected c. 1896 of red brick with terracotta facings and other detailing. The interior is also of a high quality. Italianate architecture appears in several Bathurst buildings including the former Masonic Hall, now known as Carrington House, with stuccoed and decorated surfaces on the façade, and the Westpac Bank building.

== Federation ==
During Australia's Federation period from 1900 to 1915, there was experimentation in design and construction. The Experimental Farm (now part of Charles Sturt University) is an example of the Federation style. Many of the Federation style buildings have decorative timber fret work and terracotta or iron roofs.

== Inter-War period ==
During the Inter War period from 1915 to 1940, there was great architectural change. Examples in Bathurst include the Knickerbocker Hotel in the functionalist style and the old Commonwealth Bank built in the Free Classical style. With the coming of electricity in 1924 unique cast iron light posts and lanterns were installed in the centre of the wide city streets and these are still an architectural feature of the city streetscape.

== See also ==
- Australian non-residential architectural styles
