= Architecture of Peja =

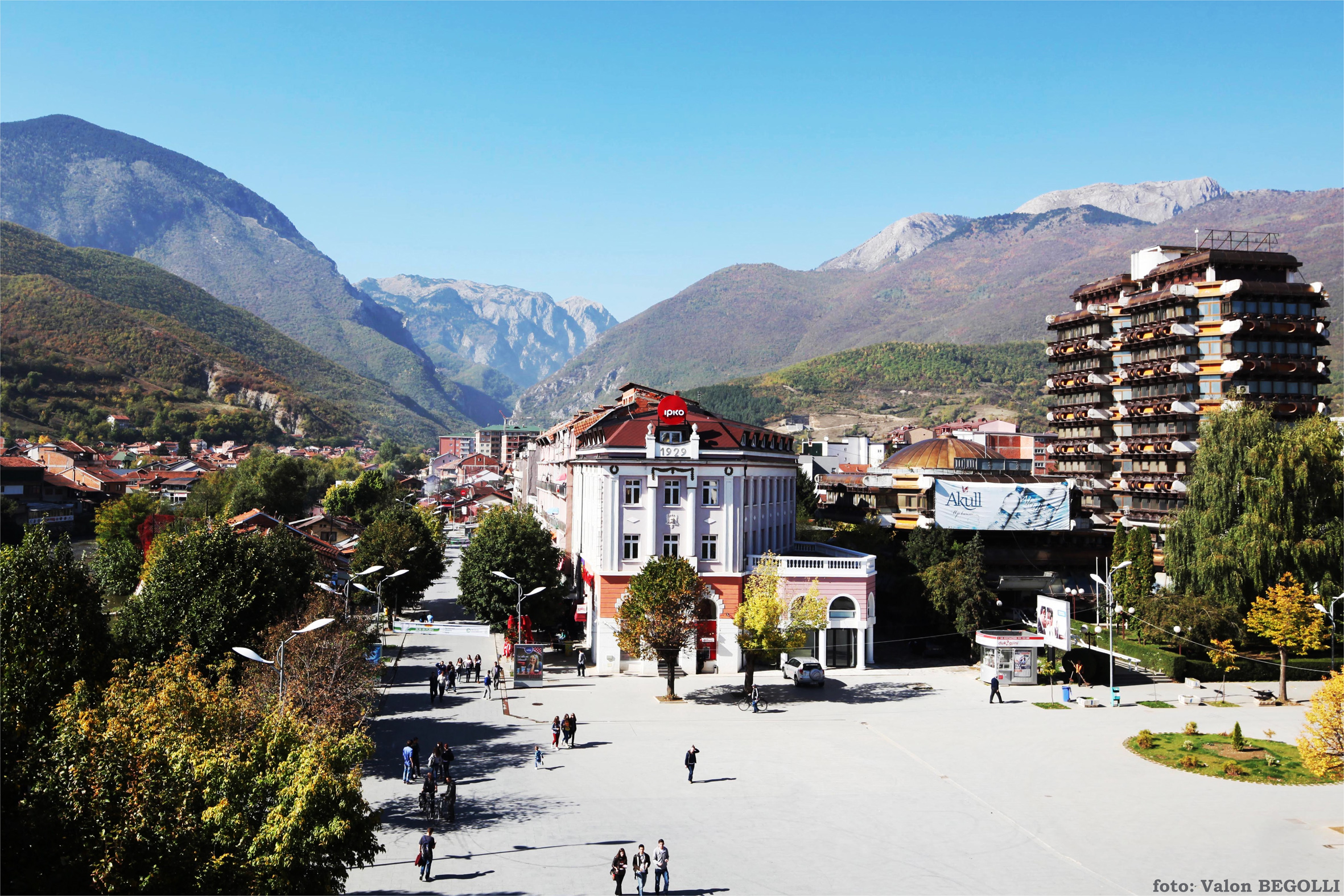
Main square of the city of Peja

The architecture of Peja, Kosovo, describes a large mixture of architectural structures which are a reflection of the influential foreign rule all across the city. The architecture of the city consists of buildings, structures and constructions which were built with an architectural influence of the Byzantine architecture, Serbo-Byzantine architecture, Ottoman architecture, Stalinist architecture (former Yugoslavia), and Modern cultures/architectures. Because of this there are many churches, mosques, buildings which are attraction points in the city and were built by the aforementioned influences. The rule of the Ottoman and Serbian empires and the historical influence of former Yugoslavia (Communist era) have shaped the architectural landscape of the city to become a conglomerate of cultures.

== Serbo-Byzantine Structures in Peja ==
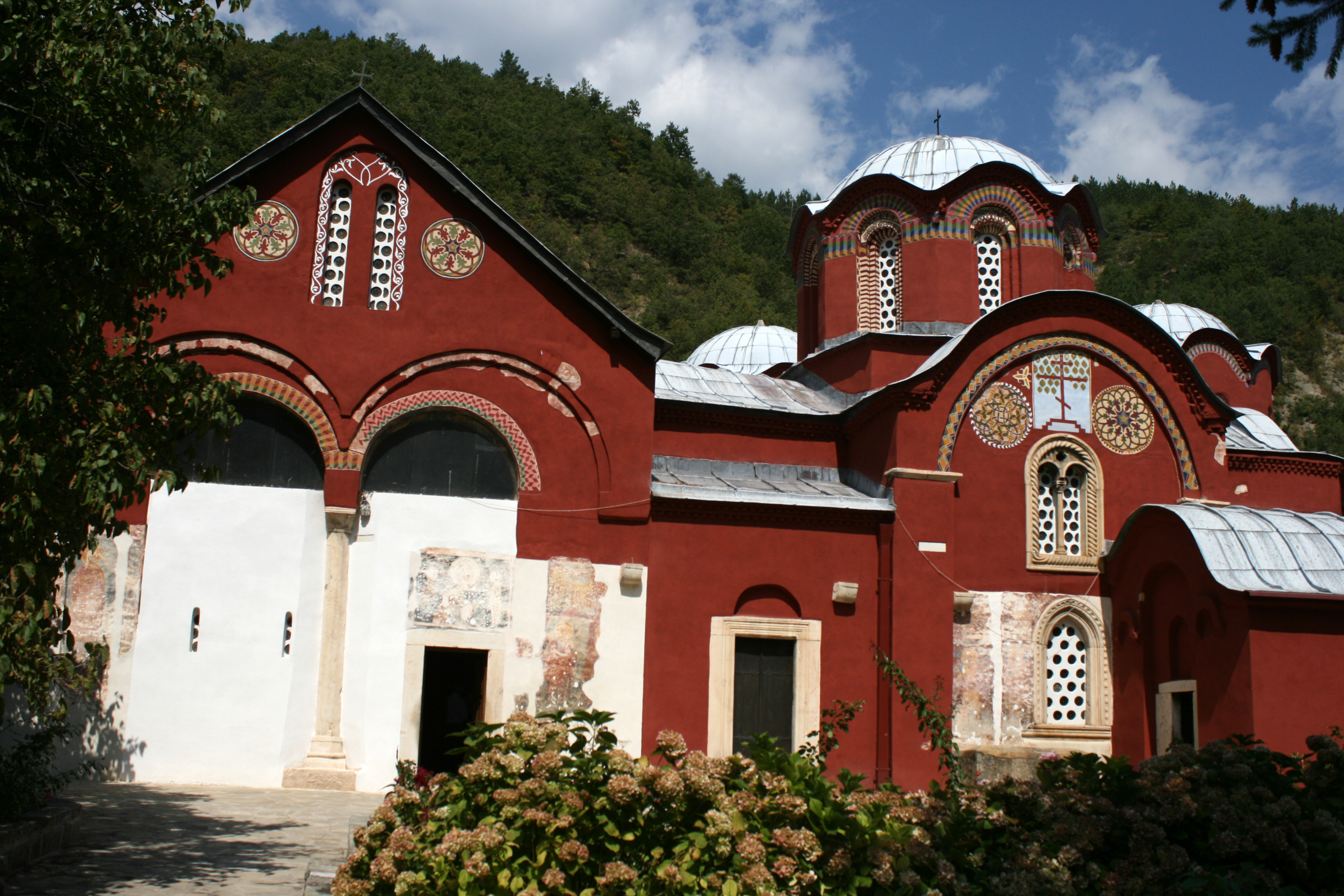
Main church of Patriarchate of Peć in Peja

=== Patriarchate of Peć ===
The Patriarchate of Peć is a Serbian-Orthodox Monastery and serves as the seat of the Serbian archbishopric and patriarchs. It is believed that the Patriarchate was found when Saint Sava around 1235 was still alive and the site became a metoh (land owned and governed by a monastery).

The Patriarchate of Peć consists of four main structures (churches). Its main churches are the Holy Apostles church (1266), the Church of Saint Demetrius (1320), the Church of the Holy Virgin Hodegetria (1330), the church of Saint Nicholas. The decoration of the Church of Saint Demetrius was decorated with frescoes around 1345. Paint decoration was used for the exterior walls instead of creating a relief from stone and brick.

The Patriarchate of Peć was added to the UNESCO World Heritage Site list in 2004 as an extension to the Dečani Monastery, these structures can be found under the category of Medieval Monuments in Kosovo

In the 14th century the Church of the Holy Apostles was decorated since small modifications were made to it.

The Serbo-Byzantine architecture has been influenced by the Byzantine architecture and art traditions. Churches built with a Serbo-Byzantine architecture have a rectangular foundation, they have a central main dome with other smaller domes surrounding the main dome. A typical Serbo-Byzantine church has a rectangular foundation, with a major dome in the center with smaller domes around the center one. Usually Serbo-Byzantine monasteries/churches are decorated with frescoes that depict biblical stories.

Today, the Patriarchate of Peć has built a high wall in its outskirts and has a military/police post block at its entrance which is guarded by local police or KFOR as a security measure for the Serb minority live in the facilities.

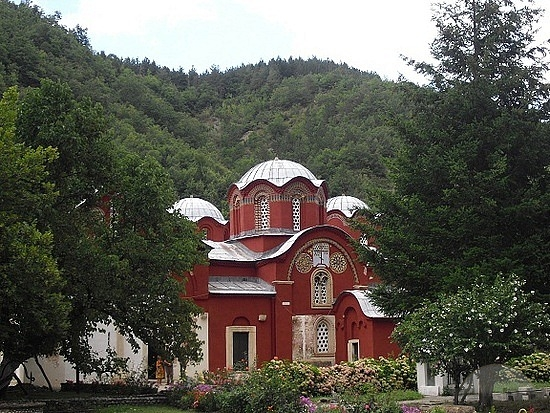
Patriarchate of Peć painted in red

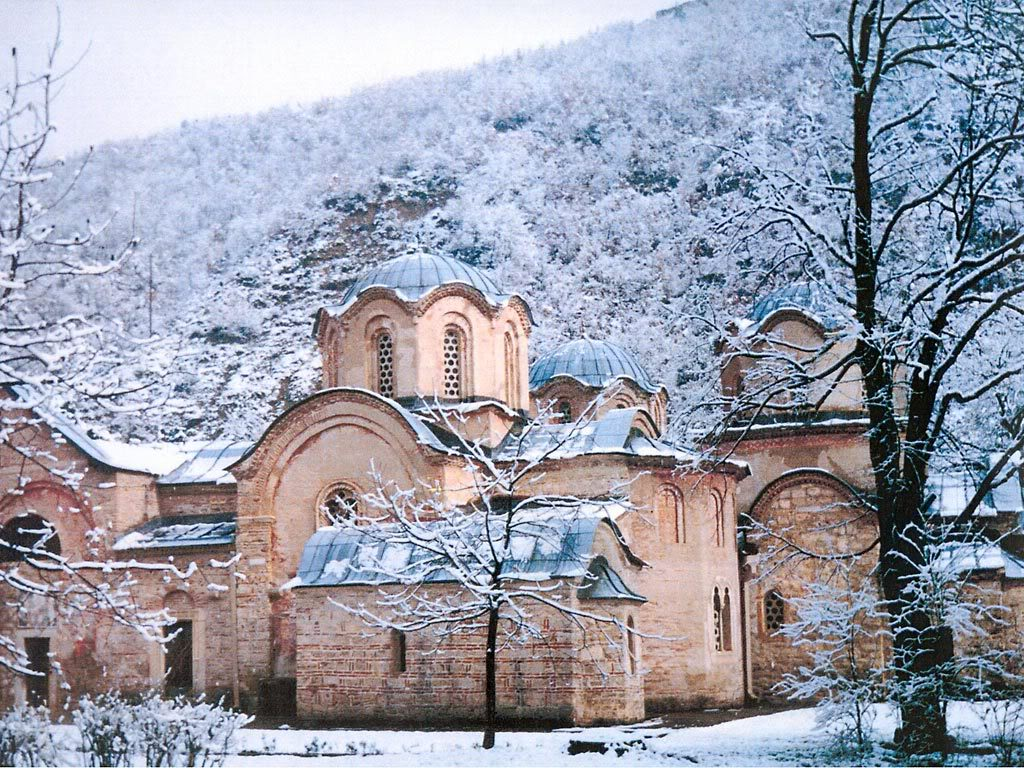
Main Church unpainted

== Ottoman structures in Peja ==
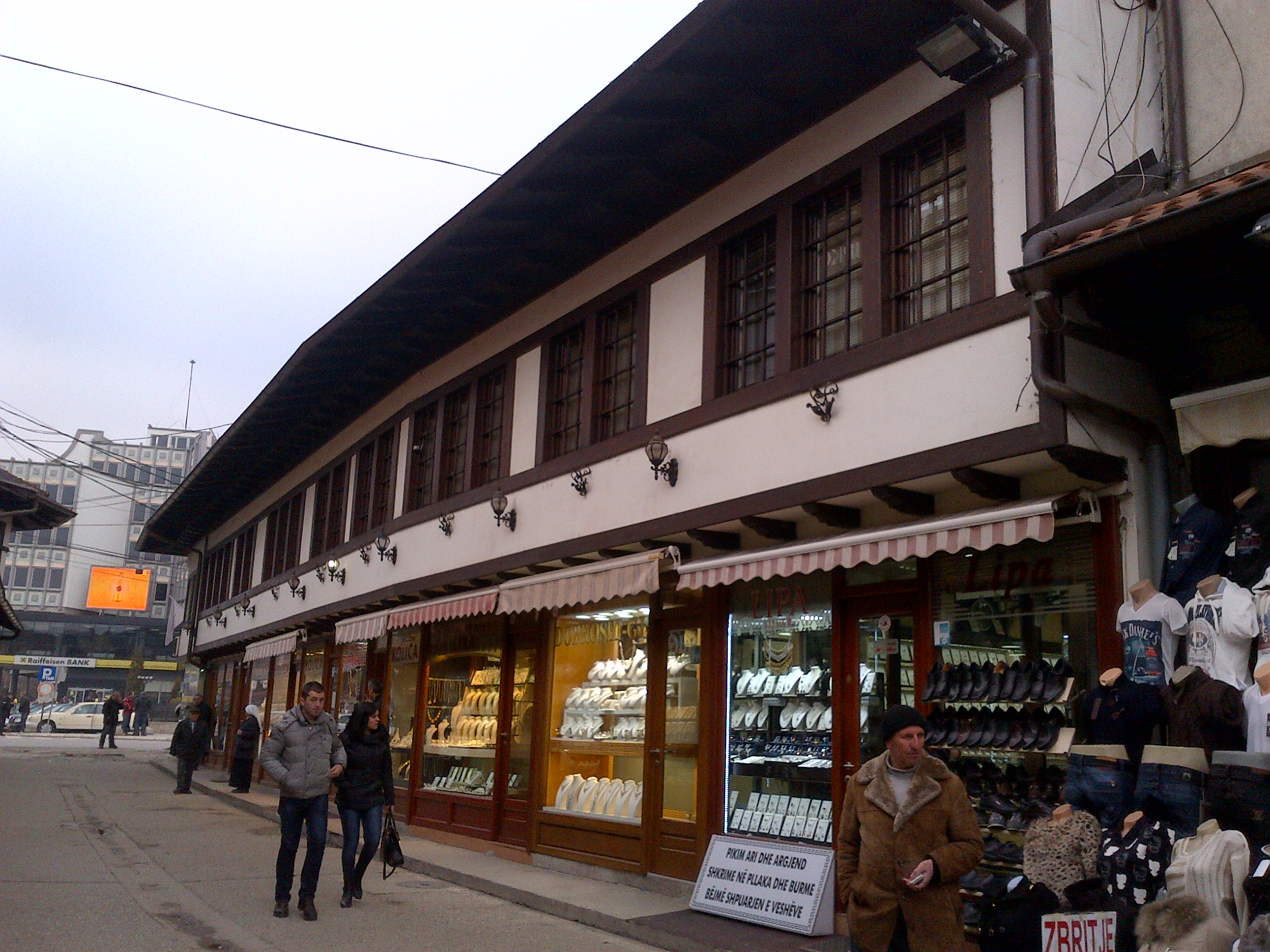
Bazaar of Peja serves as the main market for Gold shops

=== Bazaar of Peja ===
The Bazaar of Peja is located (42.659701°N 20.292903°E) in the center of the city located near the river between parallel residence zones and is a remnant of the Ottoman rule there. The earliest mention of the Bazaar of Peja according to some sources is around the 14th century. The market historically housed blacksmiths and carpenters but also facilitated the agricultural market.

The Bazaar of Peja or Pazar (in Albanian) has mainly an Ottoman architecture on the buildings, which mainly serve as stores today.

The Bazaar of Peja was completely destroyed at least twice, once during the Italian occupation in 1943, and once during the 1999 war in Kosovo. Today the Bazaar of Peja, or locally known as Çarshia e Gjatë, is fully rebuilt (after the 1999 war) and still keeps the Ottoman architecture, and is the main market in the city of Peja, and is one of the many monuments which are under protection by the law.

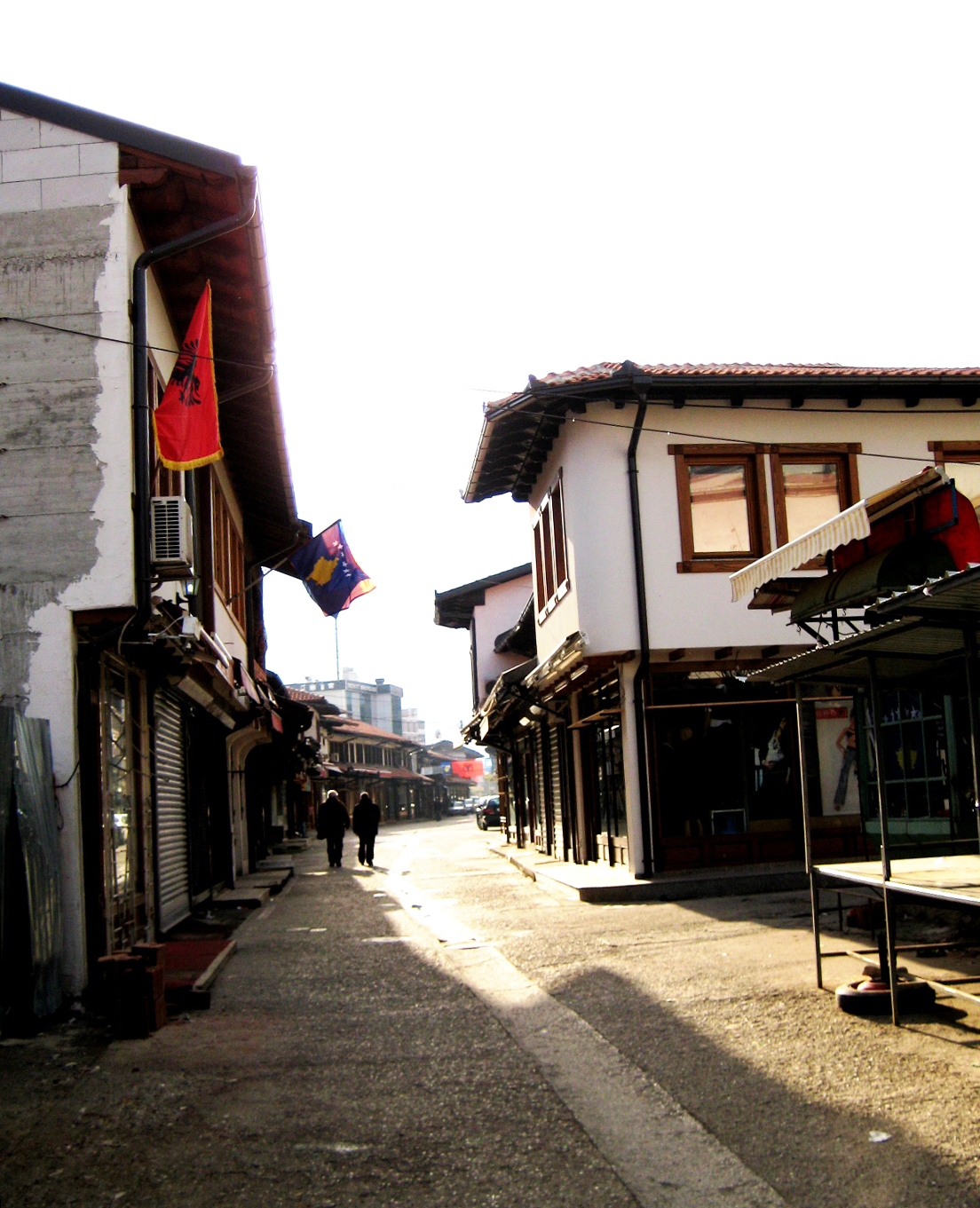
Bazaar of Peja shown with many shops closed on a Sunday

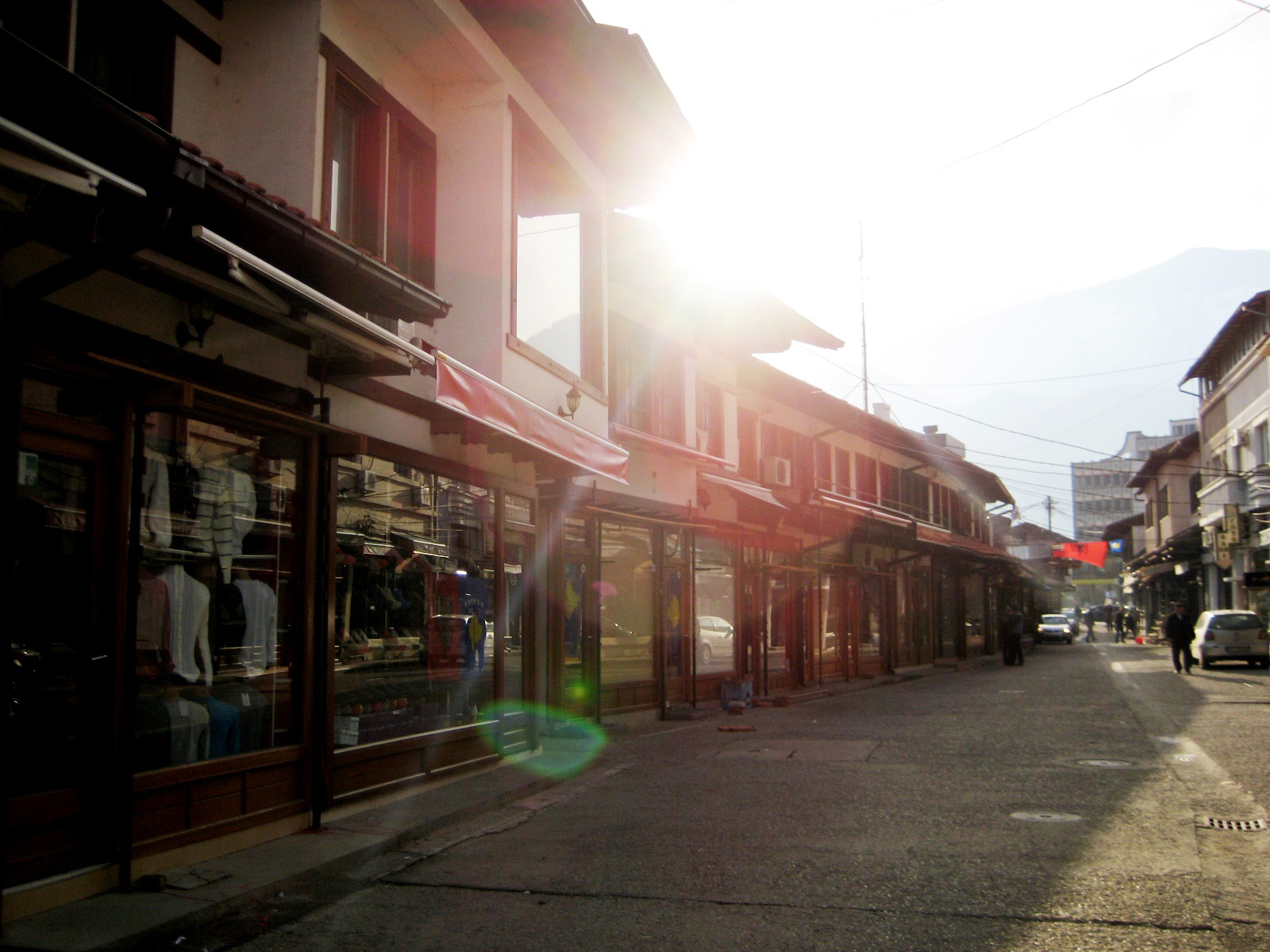
Bazaar of Peja closed on a Sunday

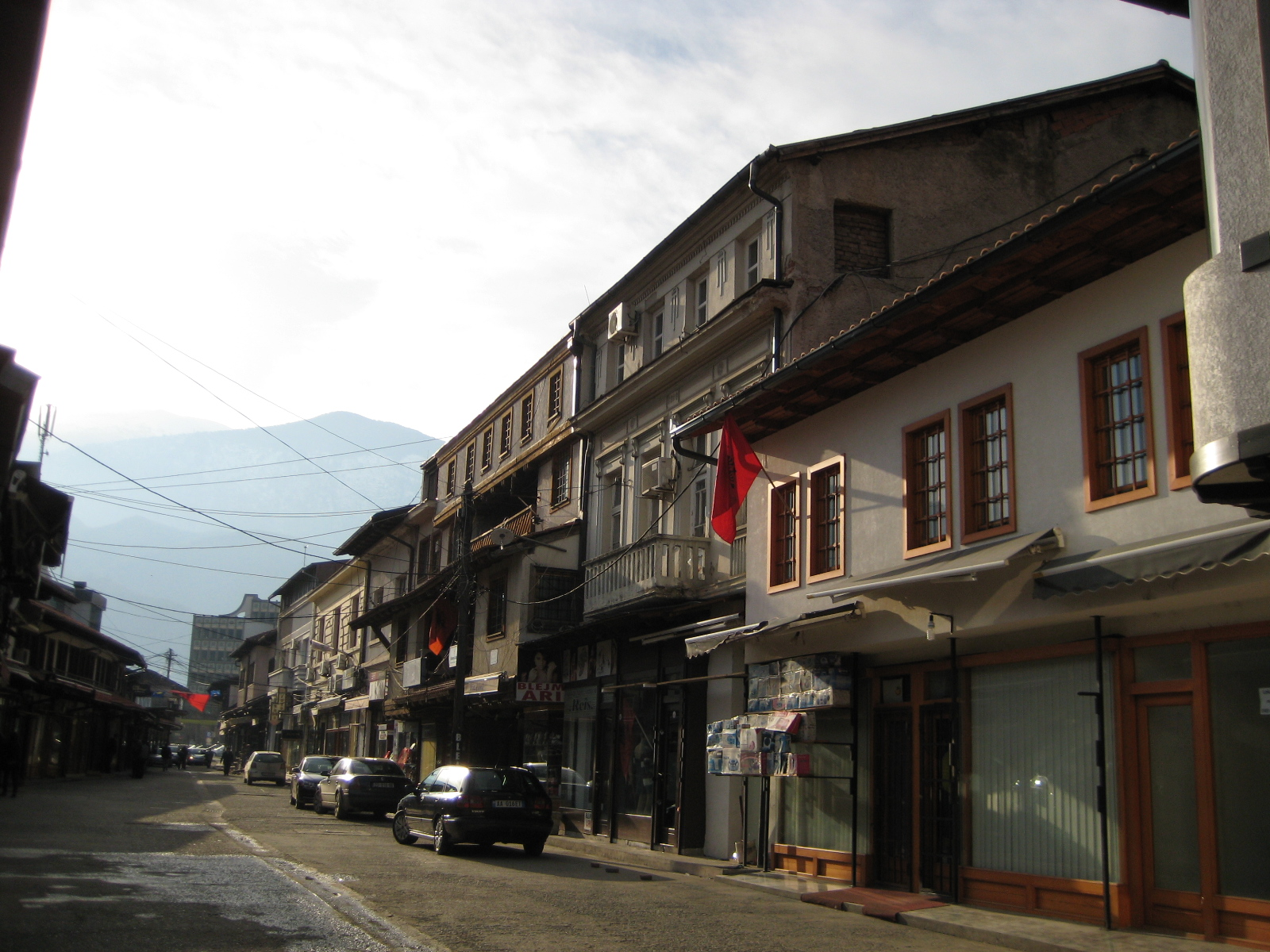
Bazaar of Peja

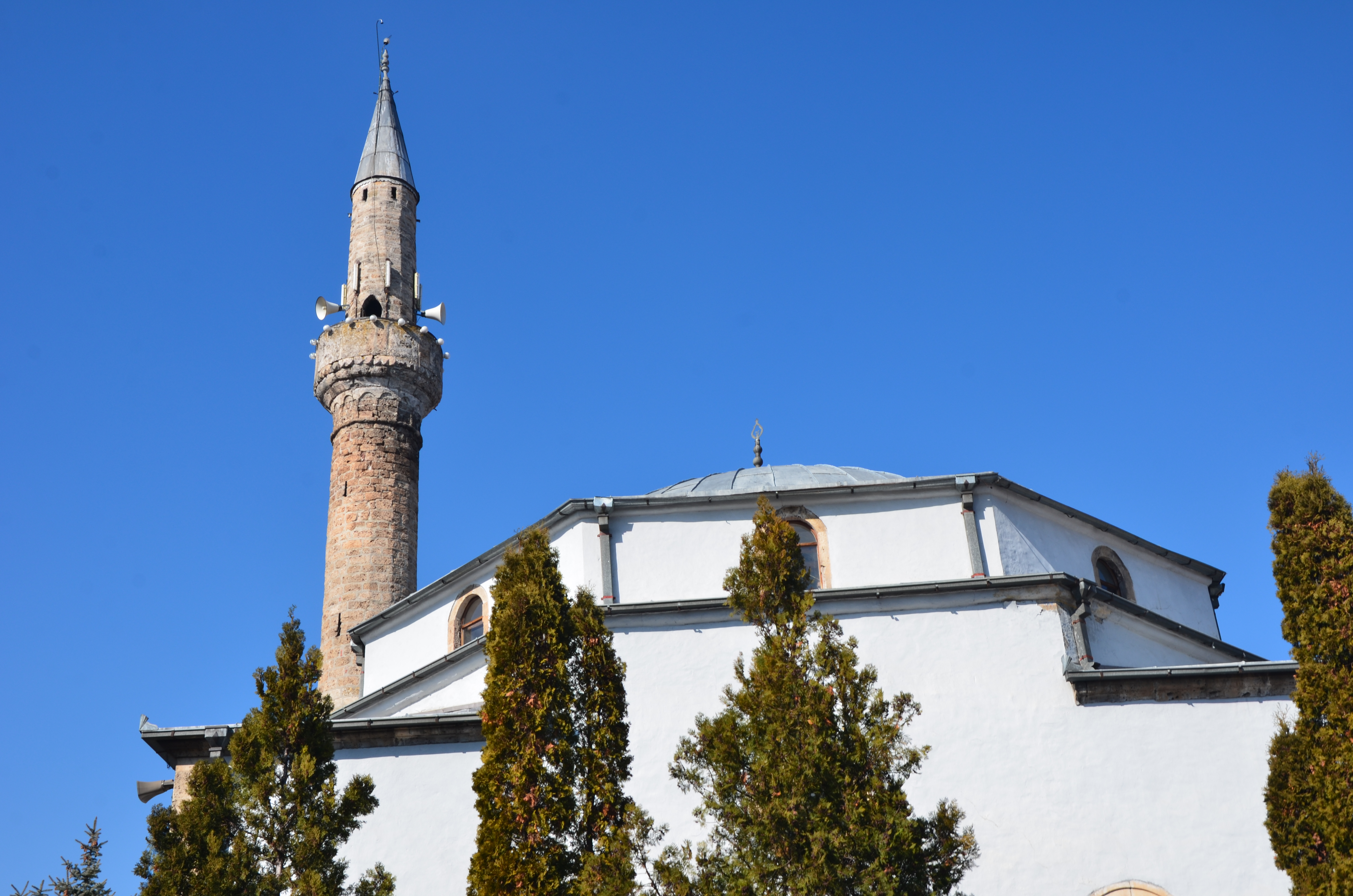
Bajrakli Mosque

=== Bajrakli Mosque (Çarshi Xhamia) ===
Is the main mosque situated in the center of the Bazaar of Peja(42.660143°N 20.293633°E). It was built in 1471 by Sultan Fatih Mehmet Hani and is an Ottoman style mosque with the oldest and highest dome in the city. The Bajrakli Xhamia is a single domed mosque which is one of the main three architectural types of mosques in Ottoman architecture. This style dates from the early Ottoman period.

The Bajrakli Xhamia was burned down once during 1943 by Italian forces when the Bazaar of Peja was completely burned down, however it was not destroyed during the 1999 War in Kosovo.

=== The Old Bath (Hammam) ===
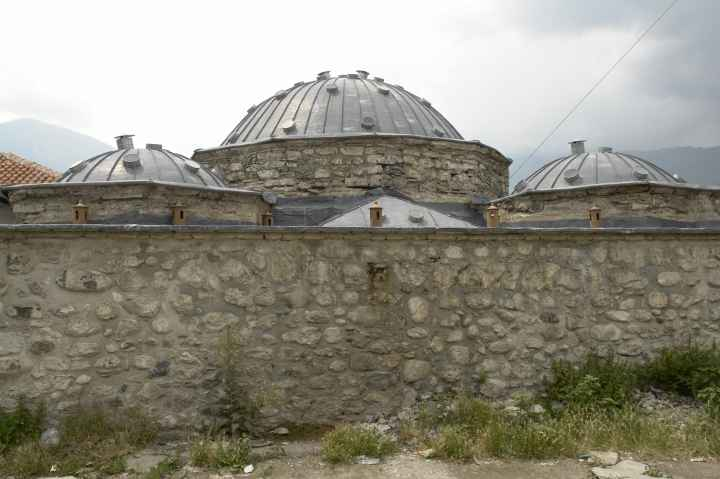
The Old Bath seen from outside

(42.65877°N 20.296487°E) The Ottoman-style hammam was built under Ottoman rule and belonged to the Dukagjini Sandzak (1462–1485). The building has an asymmetric “double” bath. According to some sources the bath was reconstructed in 1861 for unknown reasons.

The bath has an entrance area wardrobe, separation and insulation chambers, sweating-massage-bathing area, and water storage and furnace chamber. The hammam has a quadrangular foundation and was built using stone and bricks produced with an opus mixtum technique.

The bath was damaged during war and was reconstructed afterwards. Today, the hammam serves as an exhibition hall for different art shows and more.
