= Architecture of Tokyo =

The architecture of Tokyo has largely been shaped by the city's history. Twice in recent history has the metropolis been left in ruins: first in the 1923 Great Kantō earthquake and later after extensive firebombing in World War II. Because of this and other factors, Tokyo's current urban landscape is mostly modern and contemporary architecture, and older buildings are scarce. Tokyo once was a city with low buildings and packed with single family homes, today the city has a larger focus on high rise residential homes and urbanization. Tokyo's culture is changing as well as increased risk of natural catastrophes, because of this architecture has had to make dramatic changes since the 1990s. Located off of Tokyo Bay which makes typhoons and rising sea levels a current risk, along with volcanoes and large earthquakes. As a result of this, a new focus has been placed on waterborne risks such as rising sea levels and seismic events.

Tokyo in recent years has been growing at a steady rate. As a result, new buildings have been built at increased heights in order to make the most out of the land they occupy. Tokyo continues to advance in technology and grow, which will continue to change its architecture for years to come.

== History of Japanese architecture ==
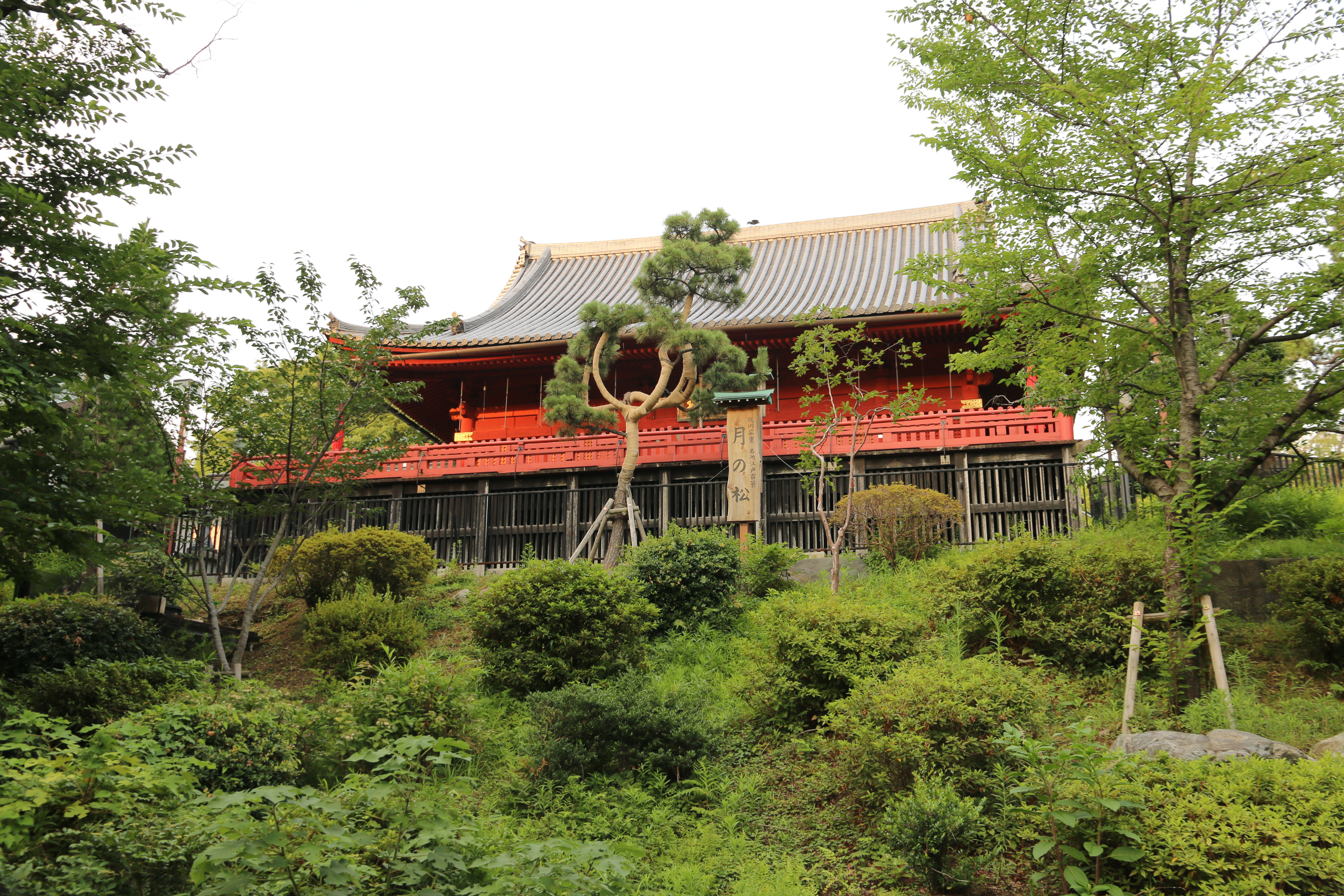
A Temple in Tokyo

Japanese architects have designed a way to build temples, furniture, and homes without using screws or nails. To keep the piece together joints are constructed to hold everything in place. However, more time-consuming, joints tend to hold up to natural disasters better than nails and screws, which is how some temples in Japan are still standing despite recent natural events.

Japanese homes were influenced from China greatly until 57 BC, when Japanese homes started to grow to be more distinct from other cultures. Until 660 AD homes and building constructed in Japan were made from stone and timber. Even though all buildings from this era are long gone there are documents showing traditional structures. Contrary to this however, wood still remains the most important material in Japanese architecture.

== Historic architects ==
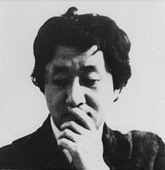
Arata Isozaki

- Arata Isozaki: Isozaki was born on July 23, 1931, in Kyushu, Japan. He studied architecture at the University of Tokyo. In 1963 he opened up his own studio and was the leading architect during the postwar period in Japan. Isozaki's first building he worked on was the Ōita Prefectural Library (1966).
- Kenzo Tange: Tange was born on September 4, 1913. His best known work is the Hiroshima Peace Center and the 1964 Olympic games gymnasium. In Tokyo his design for the New Tokyo City Hall Complex made him a famous both local and internationally.

== Notable buildings ==
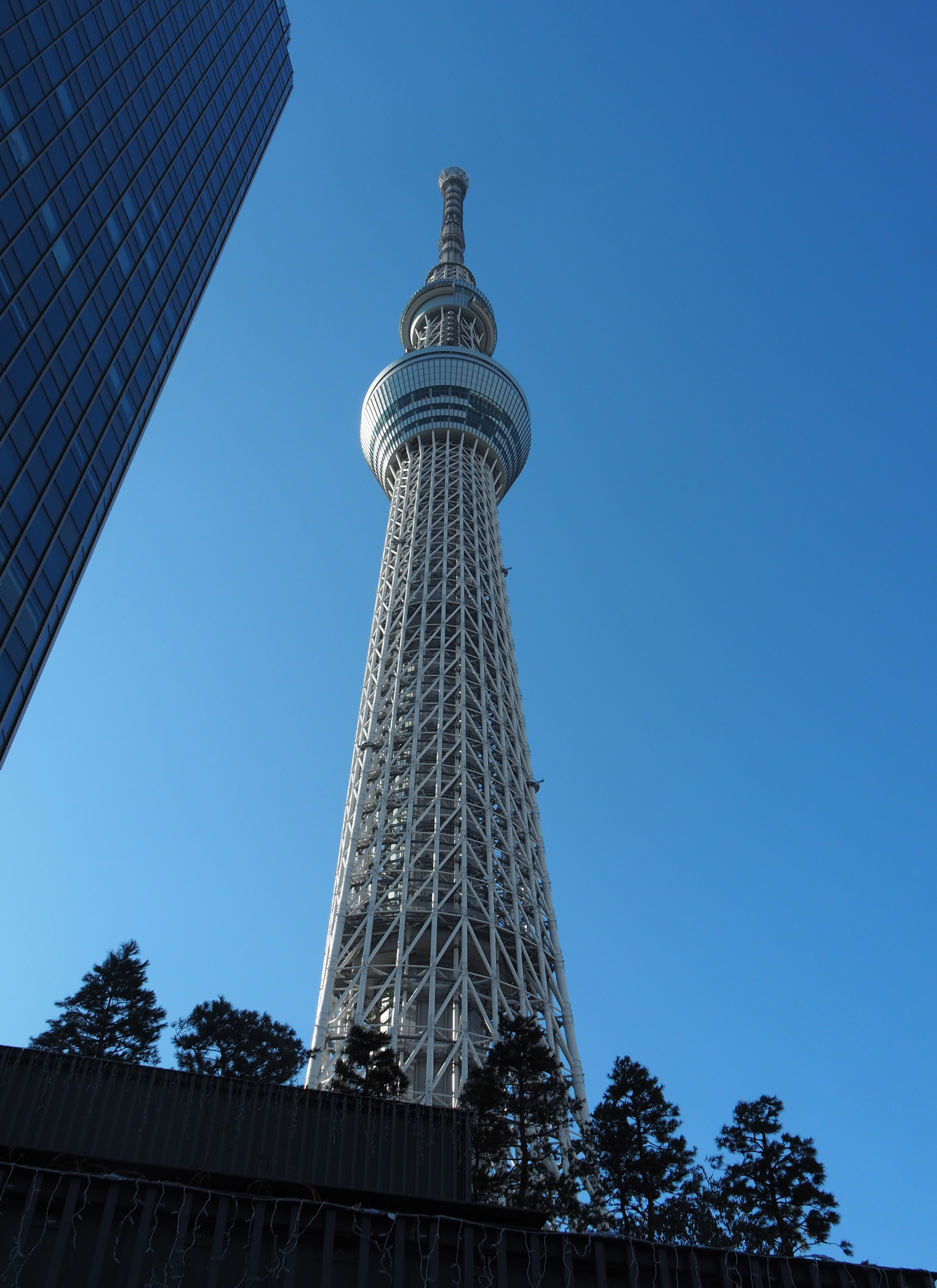
Tokyo Skytree

- Tokyo Skytree: One of the most famous buildings in Tokyo is the Skytree standing at 1,148 feet tall which makes it the third tallest building in the world and the world's largest free-standing tower. The main function of the Skytree is for telecommunications. The start of construction on the building started in 2008 and was finished in May 2012, the main architect on the project was the Nikken Sekkei firm. Today the tower is a popular tourist stop with its observation decks and restaurants located in the tower.
- Tokyo Tower: Tokyo Tower is used as an observatory tower along with a broadcasting antenna. It is located in the Minato district within Tokyo, Japan. The tower was finished in 1958 and cost 2.8 Billion Yen. Standing at 1,092 feet tall, this is the second largest tower in Japan, right after the Tokyo Skytree. The tower was originally modeled off the Eiffel Tower in Paris, France; however, Tokyo tower is 13 meters taller than the Eiffel Tower. Tokyo Tower is painted in orange and white to comply with the air traffic in and out of Tokyo. This paint job, however, has to be repainted every 5 years.
- Asakusa Kannon Temple: Built in 645 A.D, located in one of the most famous parts of Tokyo, Asakusa Kannon Temple is one of the oldest and most famous tourist destinations in Tokyo. This temple can be found in Asakusa district located in the center of Shitmachi. Dedicated to Bodhisattva Kannon, used for a Buddhist Temple and practices. Asakusa also hosts an annual festival called Sanja Matsuri.
- Nakagin Capsule Tower: Built in 1972 by architect Kisho Kurokawa, the Nakagin Capsule Tower was built in only 30 days. Unlike other architecture that tower is built of removable cubes, each measuring to 107 feet, they are furnished with basic appliances, bathroom, and bed. Originally plans called to have each cube replaces every 25 years, however this proved to be too expensive. Since then residents have modified the cubes for different purposes, however the tower still home residents to this day.
- Yoyogi National Gymnasium: Built for the 1964 Olympic games the Yoyogi National Gymnasium was finished a little over a month before the games started. The architect on the project was Kenzo Tange. The gymnasium was used for basketball and swimming competitions during the games. In 2016 a campaign started to get the building on the world heritage list.
- Rainbow Bridge
- National Diet Building
- Tokyo Metropolitan Government Building
- Tokyo Big Sight
- Asahi Beer Hall by Philippe Starck
- Tokyo Station
- Tokyo International Forum
- Roppongi Hills
- Tokyo Imperial Palace
- Akasaka Palace

== Gallery ==
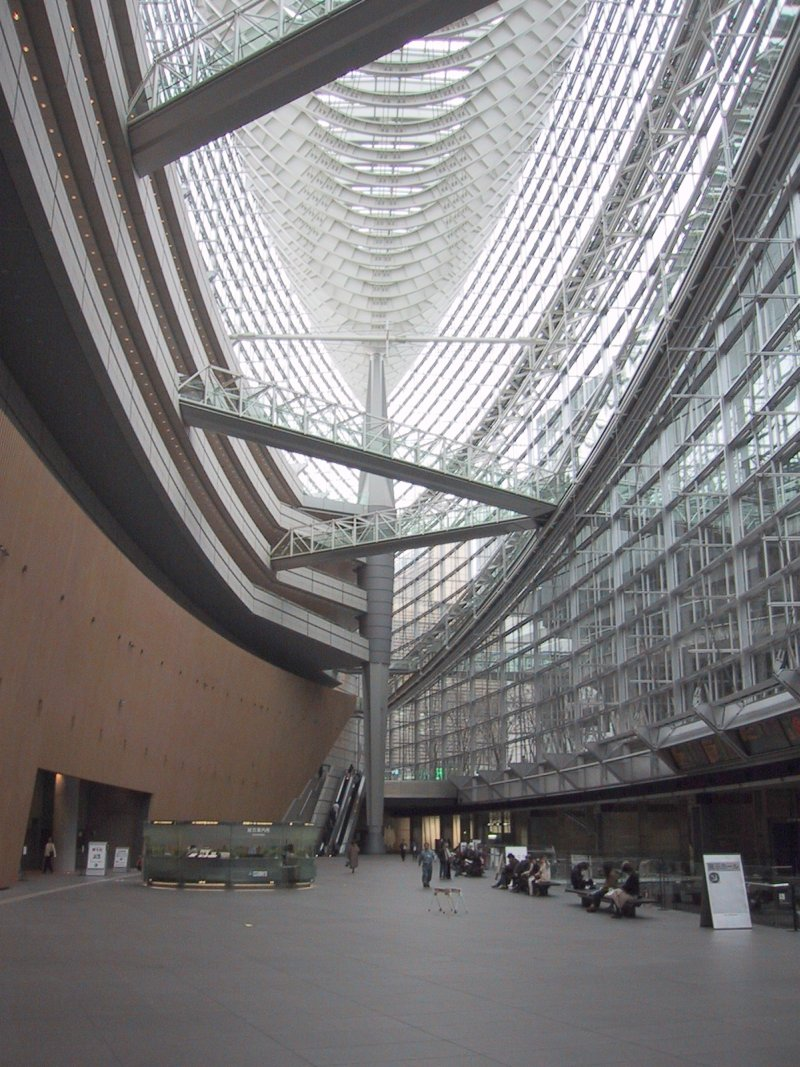
Tokyo International Forum

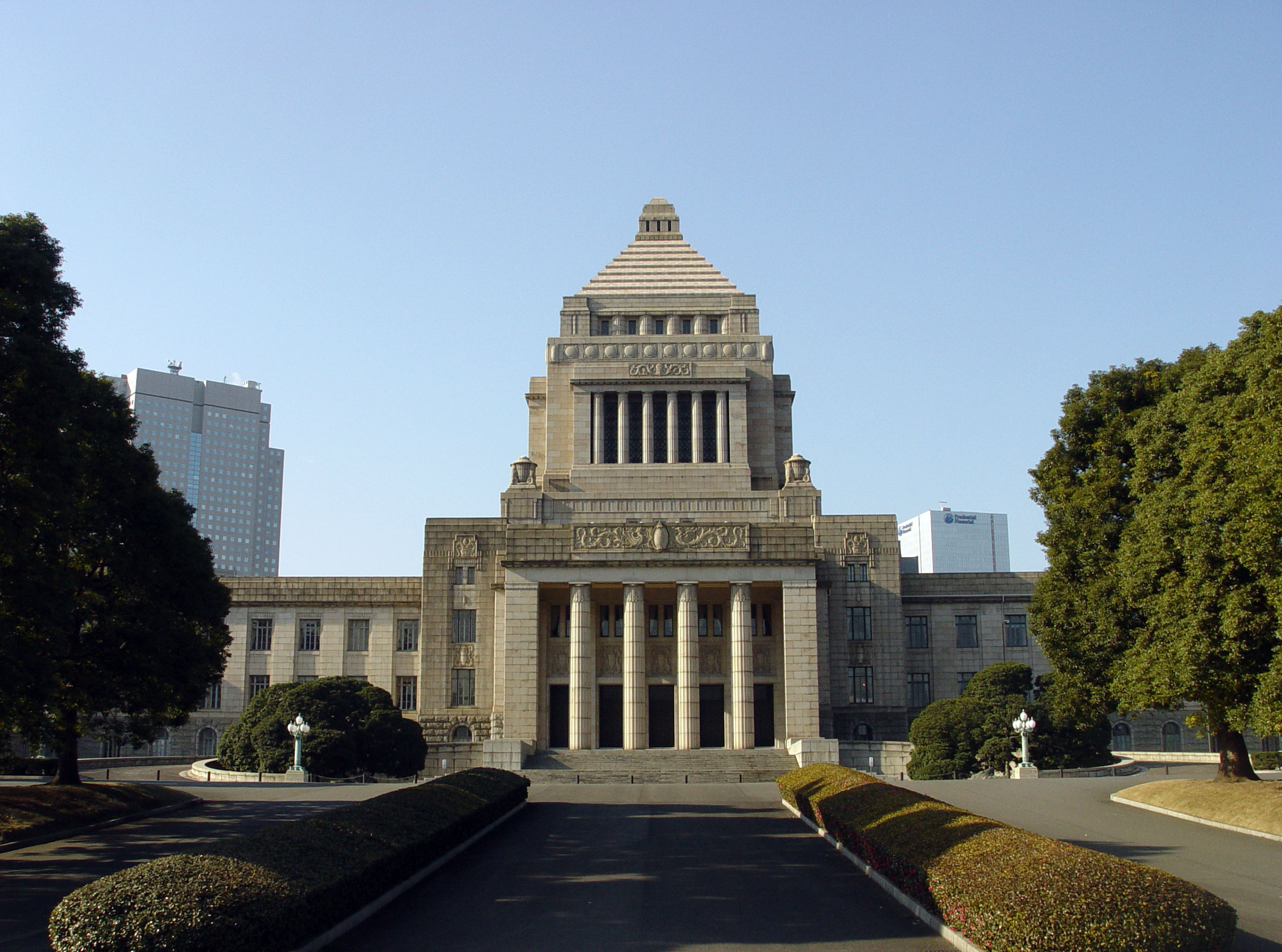
National Diet Building

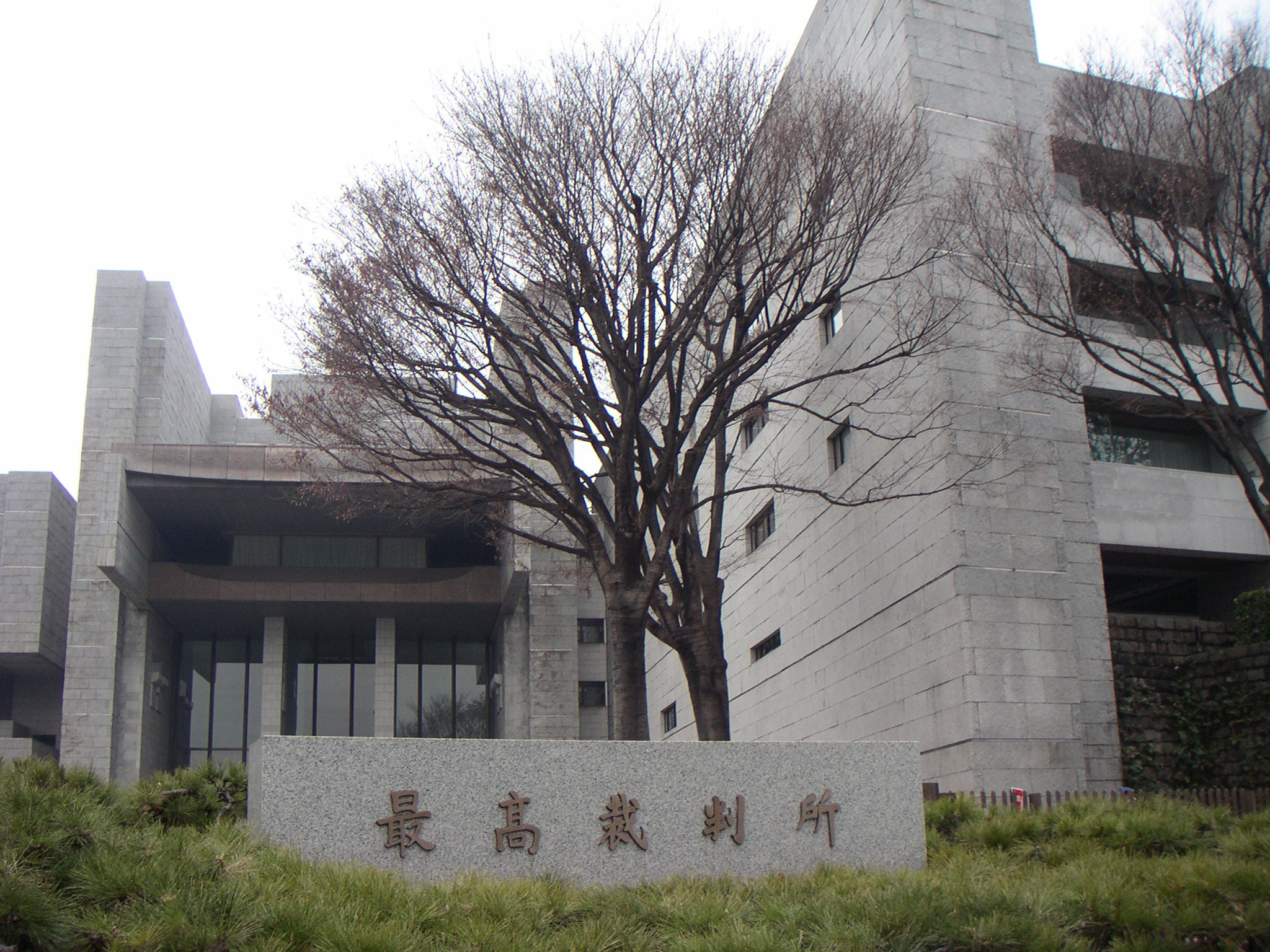
Supreme Court of Japan

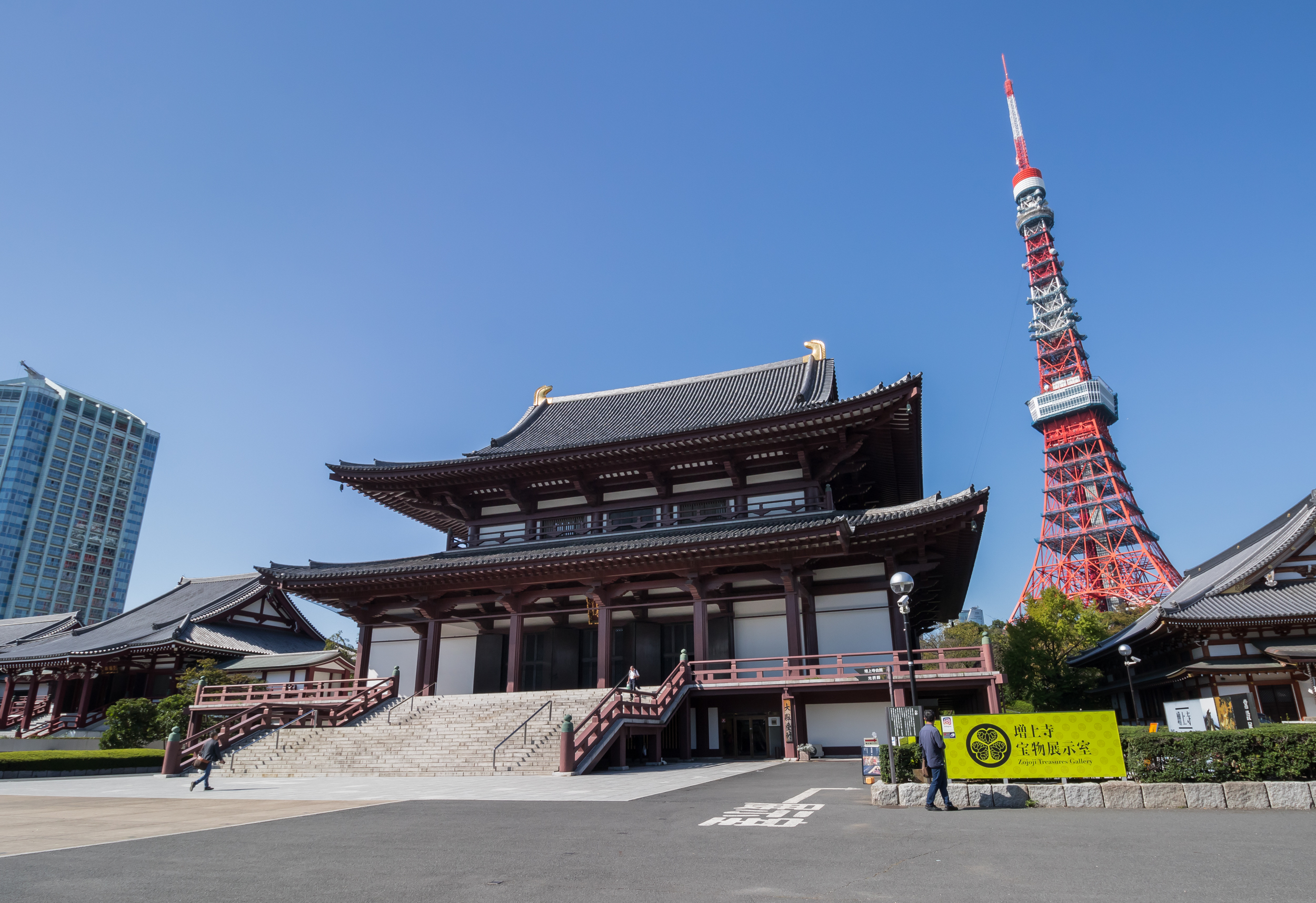
Zōjōji (a temple in Shiba Park) and Tokyo Tower

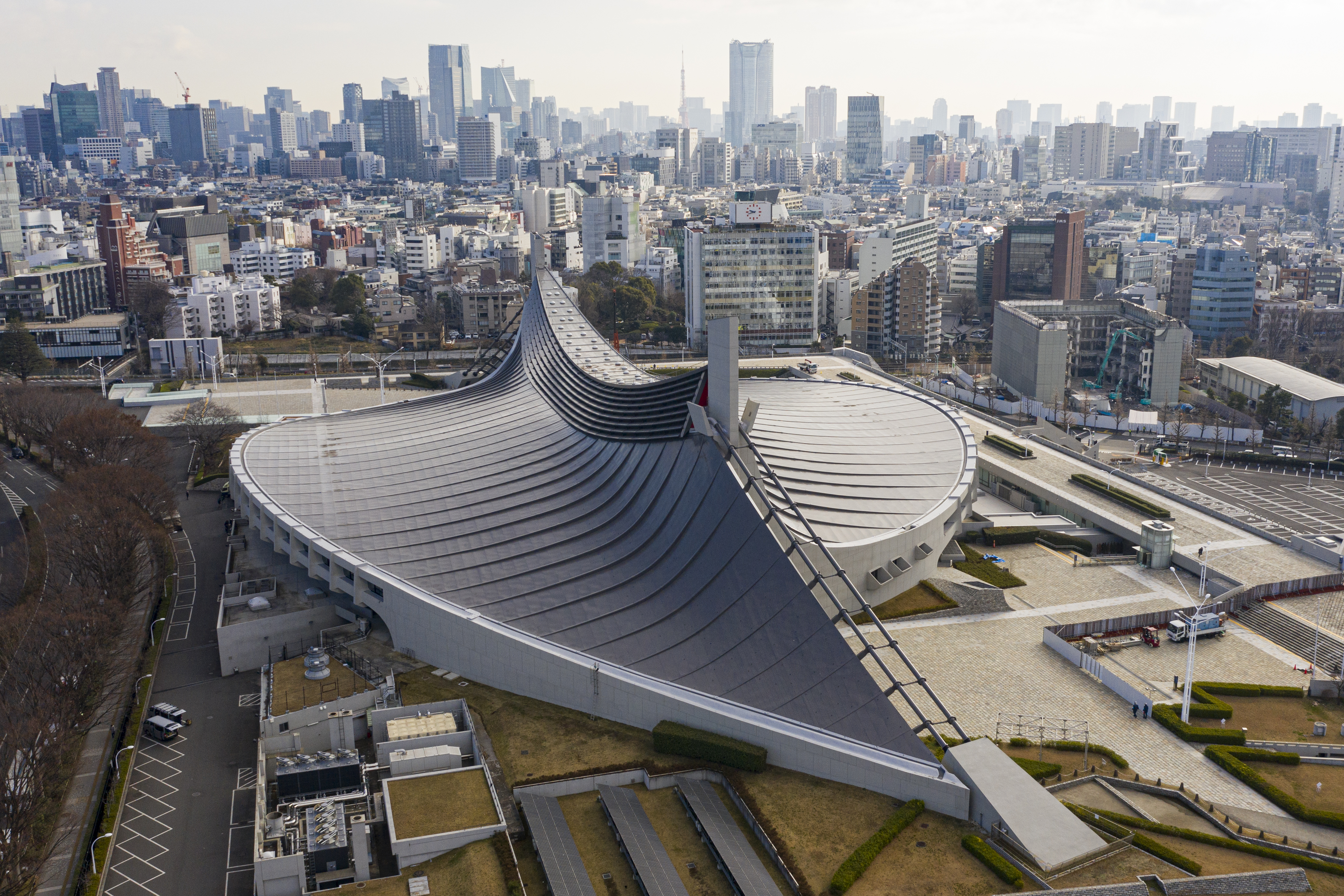
Yoyogi National Gymnasium, a work of Kenzo Tange
