= Architecture of Johannesburg =

Architecture in South Africa

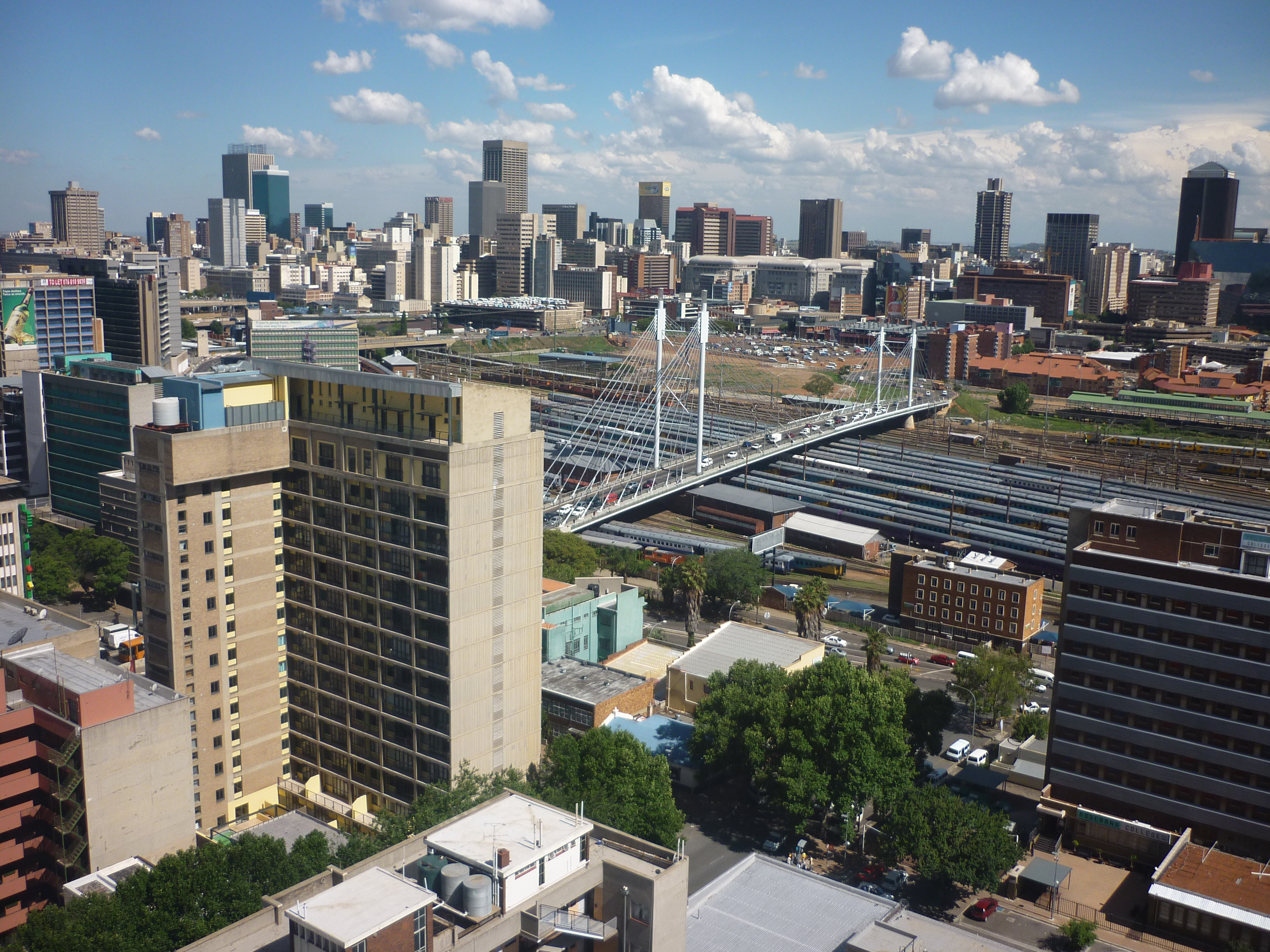
Panorama of the central business district of Johannesburg, South Africa.

Johannesburg is the capital of the Gauteng province and the financial hub of South Africa. Founded in 1886, the city is located in the Witwatersrand region, which has vast gold deposits. The town experienced rapid growth as the gold deposits were exploited, and is now South Africa's largest urban centre. As a result, the Johannesburg area has a wide variety of architecture, from early Art Nouveau to Postmodern buildings. Hillbrow, for example, contains many buildings constructed since the 1950s, including the Hillbrow Tower.

== Notable buildings ==
Johannesburg features a variety of commercial and residential buildings, so there are also a few modern buildings such as the KwaDukuza eGoli Hotel and the Trust Bank Building. The Johannesburg-Pretoria combined metropolitan area has the densest concentration of skyscrapers on the continent and one of the densest in the world.

- Carlton Centre is a skyscraper and shopping centre located in central Johannesburg. At 223 metres (730 ft), it was the tallest building in Africa until 2019. It was the tallest building in the southern hemisphere when originally completed. The Carlton Centre has 50 floors and is about 40m short of being one of the world's tallest 100 skyscrapers. The foundations of the two buildings in the complex are 3.5m in diameter and extend 20m down to the bedrock, 30m below street level. The building houses both offices and shops and has over 46 percent of the floor area below ground level.[1] A viewing deck on the 50th floor offers views of Johannesburg and Pretoria.
- Ponte City Apartments is a skyscraper in the suburb of Hillbrow. It was built in 1975 to a height of 173 m (567.6 ft), making it the tallest residential skyscraper in Africa. The 54-storey building is cylindrical, with an open centre allowing additional light into the apartments. The centre space is known as "the core" and rises above an uneven rock floor. Ponte City was an extremely desirable address for its views over all of Johannesburg and its surroundings. The sign on top of the building is the highest and largest such sign in the southern hemisphere. It currently advertises the South African mobile phone company Vodacom.
- Marble Towers is a skyscraper in the Central Business District. It was built in 1973 and is 32 storeys tall. The building has an eight-storey car park attached to it. It has the biggest electronic sign in the Southern Hemisphere, measuring 44 metres by 32 metres by 12 metres. It is made out of a mixture of concrete and marble. Its main use is for commercial offices.
- KwaDukuza eGoli Hotel is a skyscraper in the Central Business District. The complex, built in 1970 originally as "The Tollman Towers" (owned by the prominent South African family of that. name), was two separate towers, one 40 storeys and the other 22, linked by a four-storey podium with a pool deck and a running track. The building was empty for many years as the hotel, The Johannesburg Sun, relocated to Sandton. The building was then converted to a Holiday Inn, which also soon failed. The new KwaDukuza eGoli Hotel opened in 2001 when it hosted 3000 police officers for the world summit on sustainable development. Owned by Mark Whitehead of Whitehead Enterprises, this venture also soon went out of business. The building is currently "mothballed."

Sandton City

- Sandton City is a shopping centre located in Sandton, built as a pioneer centre in 1973. The tower was built as part of a business park for central Sandton, a suburb of Johannesburg. Liberty Properties announced in 2008 that Sandton City would receive a R1.77 billion upgrade. Liberty Properties Chief Executive Samuel Ogbo envisaged the complex as South Africa's very own Wall Street. The redevelopment will include the construction of a 60-storey office tower, new retail and office space and residential apartments. The extension will stretch to 30,000 square metres and the total complex will have a gross lettable area of 158,000 square metres.
- The Trust Bank Building is a skyscraper in the Central Business District. It was built in 1970 to a height of 140 metres. The building is the former head office of Trust Bank of South Africa, and as such has one of the largest bank vaults in South Africa.
- 11 Diagonal Street is a skyscraper built in 1984 to a height of 80 metres. It is designed to look like a diamond as it reflects different views of the Central Business District from each angle of the building.
