= Doctor of Architecture in the United States =

Professional doctorate in architecture

In the United States, a Doctor of Architecture (D.Arch.) is a professional doctorate conferred upon the completion of an architectural doctoral program accredited by the National Architectural Accrediting Board (NAAB). The only university currently offering a Doctor of Architecture degree program in the United States is the University of Hawaiʻi at Mānoa.

== Background ==
Most state registration boards in the United States require a degree from an accredited professional degree program as a prerequisite for licensure. The National Architectural Accrediting Board, the sole agency authorized to accredit United States professional degree programs in architecture, recognizes three types of degrees: the Bachelor of Architecture, the Master of Architecture, and the Doctor of Architecture. Doctor of Architecture and Master of Architecture degree programs may consist of a pre-professional undergraduate degree and a professional graduate degree that, when earned sequentially, constitute an accredited professional education. However, the pre-professional degree is not, by itself, recognized as an accredited degree.

== Active accreditation ==
The only university in the United States offering a Doctor of Architecture degree program is the University of Hawaiʻi at Mānoa. The university's Doctorate of Architecture degree program was first accredited by the NAAB in 1999. Admission to the program is open to students who have completed high school, transfer students who have completed some college-level work, and students who have completed undergraduate or advanced degrees. Completion of the degree requires 120 undergraduate credits and 90 graduate credits.
