= Society of American Registered Architects =

The Society of American Registered Architects is a professional organization for architects in the United States.

== History ==
The Society of American Registered Architects was founded on November 9, 1956 by Wilfred J. Gregson. As a professional society that includes the participation of all architects, regardless of their roles in the architectural community. The society follows the Golden Rule and supports the concept of profitable professionalism for its members. It stresses a high degree of professional fellowship and supports its motto of "Architect helping Architect".

== Wilfred Gregson ==
Wilfred J. Gregson (1900–1998) was an architect in the United States who founded the Society of American Registered Architects. The society presents an award named in his honor. He established the firm Gregson and Associates.

Gregson had a Scottish father and an English mother.

He was based in Atlanta. In 1939 he worked as an inspector for the Civilian Conservation Corps.

Gregson was involved with the design of the Georgia exhibit at the 1962 World's Fair in Seattle.

He testified before a U.S. House of Representatives Labor and Education subcommittee in 1966.

He warned about structural issues at the U.S. Capitol and storing files in its attic, saying it was not designed for that purpose.

== Membership classifications ==
- Professional and Associate Members - for registered architects and individuals working towards architectural registration.
- Affiliate Members - for individuals, firms and corporations involved in the construction industry.
- Student Members - for individuals studying architecture.
- International Members - for registered architects outside of North and South America.

== Local organizations ==
The society has state councils and local chapters in California, Florida, Illinois, Minnesota, New Jersey, New York, Ohio and Pennsylvania.

== See also ==
- American Institute of Architects
- American Institute of Architecture Students
- National Architectural Accrediting Board
- National Council of Architectural Registration Boards
