= Master of Architecture =

Master's degree

A Master of Architecture (M.Arch.) is a graduate professional degree in architecture qualifying the graduate to move through the various stages of professional accreditation (internship, exams) that result in receiving a license.

== Overview ==
The degree is earned through several possible paths of study, depending on both a particular program's construction, and the candidate's previous academic experience and degrees. M.Arch degrees vary in kind, so they are frequently given names such as "M.Arch I" and "M.Arch II" to distinguish them. All M.Arch degrees are professional degrees in architecture. There are, however, other master's degrees offered by architecture schools that are not accredited in any way.

Many schools offer several possible tracks of architectural education. Including study at the bachelor's and master's level, these tracks range up to 7.5 years in duration.

- One possible route is what is commonly referred to as the "4+2" course. This path entails completing a four-year, accredited, pre-professional Bachelor of Arts in architecture or a Bachelor of Science in architecture. This degree is not 3-year, depending on the nature and quality of one's undergraduate study performance, and the evaluation of the master's degree program school of one's undergraduate study Master of Architecture program. This route offers several advantages: the first four years are a bit more loose, allowing the inclusion of some liberal arts study; one can attend two different institutions for their undergraduate and graduate study, which allows one to have a more varied architectural education, and one can pick the best place for completing thesis (as one might not pick the program that has the exact focus desired for one's thesis study); and one will finish the 4+2 course of study with a master's degree that will provide the career option of teaching architecture at the collegiate level.
- The second route to obtaining an accredited master's degree begins in graduate school, with a 3 or 3.5-year master's degree (commonly called an "M.Arch I"). The advantage to this route is that the student can study something else they are interested in their undergraduate study. Because students come from different undergraduate backgrounds, the breadth of knowledge and experience in the student body of an M.Arch I program is often considered an advantage. One possible disadvantage is that the total time in school is longer (7 or 7.5 years with an undergraduate degree). Another disadvantage is that the student has a very short time to cover the extremely broad scope of subject areas of which architects are expected to have a working knowledge. Nevertheless, major schools of architecture including MIT and Harvard often offer a 3.5-year program to students already with strong architectural background, fostering a competitive and productive academic environment.
- A third possible route is what schools are calling a "post-professional" master's degree. It is research-based and often a stepping-stone to a Doctor of Philosophy in Architecture. Schools include Cornell, Harvard, Princeton, MIT, and RISD.

Some institutions offer a 5-year professional degree program. Depending on the school and course of study, this could be either a Bachelor of Architecture (B.Arch) or an M.Arch. In the U.S., it is typically a 5-year B.Arch Either degree qualifies those who complete it to sit for the ARE (the Architectural Registration Exam, the architecture equivalent of the bar exam), which leads to an architect's license in the U.S.. One disadvantage of the B.Arch degree is that it is rarely considered as sufficient qualification for teaching architecture at the university/college level in the U.S. (though there are many exceptions). Many architects who wish to teach and have only received a B.Arch choose to pursue a 3-semester master's degree (not an M.Arch) to obtain further academic qualification.

Graduate-level architecture programs consist of course work in design, building science, structural engineering, architectural history, theory, professional practice, and elective courses. For those without any prior knowledge of the field, coursework in calculus, physics, computers, statics and strengths of materials, architectural history, studio, and building science is usually required. Some architecture programs allow students to specialize in a specific aspect of architecture, such as architectural technologies or digital media. A thesis or final project is usually required to graduate.

In the United States, The National Architectural Accrediting Board (NAAB) is the sole accrediting body for professional degree programs in architecture. Since most state registration boards in the United States require any applicant for licensure to have graduated from an NAAB-accredited program, obtaining such a degree is an essential aspect of preparing for the professional practice of architecture. First time students matriculating with a 5-year B.Arch degree can also qualify for registration without obtaining a master's degree. Some programs offer a concurrent learning model, allowing students the opportunity to work in the profession while they earn their degree, so that they can test for licensure immediately upon graduation.

In Canada, Master of Architecture degrees may be accredited by the Canadian Architectural Certification Board (CACB), allowing the recipient to qualify for both the ARE and the Examination for Architects in Canada (ExAC).

As of June 2022, there were 120 accredited Master of Architecture programs in the United States, including Puerto Rico.

== Master's degree programs ==
=== Canada ===
Colleges and universities in Canada with accredited Master of Architecture degree programs are listed below:

- University of British Columbia
- University of Calgary
- Carleton University
- Université Laval
- McGill University
- University of Manitoba
- Université de Montréal
- University of Guelph (Only Master of Landscape Architecture)
- University of Toronto
- Dalhousie University
- University of Waterloo, School of Architecture
- Ryerson University

=== Australia and New Zealand ===
Universities in Australia and New Zealand with accredited Master of Architecture degree programs are listed below Architects Accreditation Council Of Australia « Recognised Architecture Qualifications:

- Curtin University
- Griffith University
- Deakin University
- Monash University
- Queensland University of Technology (QUT)
- RMIT University
- University of Adelaide
- University of Canberra
- University of Melbourne
- University of Newcastle
- University of New South Wales
- University of Queensland
- University of South Australia (UniSA)
- University of Sydney
- University of Tasmania
- University of Technology, Sydney (UTS)
- University of Western Australia
- University of Auckland
- Unitec New Zealand
- Victoria University of Wellington

=== Hong Kong ===
The only 2 universities offering HKIA (Hong Kong Institute of Architects), CAA (Commonwealth Association of Architects) & RIBA (Royal Institute of British Architects) accredited Master of Architecture for architect professional registration.

- The Chinese University of Hong Kong, School of Architecture, Hong Kong, founded in 1992
- The University of Hong Kong, Faculty of Architecture, Department of Architecture, Hong Kong, founded in 1950

=== China ===
- Tsinghua University, Beijing
- Beijing University of Civil Engineering and Architecture, Beijing
- Tongji University, Shanghai
- Southeast University, Nanjing
- Xi'an Jiaotong-Liverpool University, starting fall 2014, language: English
- Hunan University, Changsha

=== Singapore ===
- National University of Singapore
- Singapore University of Technology and Design

=== Mexico ===
In Mexico, an officially recognized Bachelor of Architecture is sufficient for practice.

- Faculty of Architecture at the National Autonomous University of Mexico
- Monterrey Institute of Technology and Higher Education
- Universidad Autónoma Benito Juárez de Oaxaca
- Universidad Autónoma de Guadalajara
- Universidad Autónoma de Nuevo León
- Universidad Autónoma de San Luis Potosí

=== Africa ===
- University of Pretoria
- University of Cape Town
- University of the Witwatersrand
- University of Johannesburg
- Tshwane University of Technology
- University of Nigeria, Enugu Campus
- University of Carthage
- Uganda Martyrs University
- University of the Free State
- Nelson Mandela Metropolitan University
- University of Nairobi
- Caleb University
- Bells University of Technology
- Ardhi University, Tanzania
- Kwame Nkrumah University of Science and Technology, Ghana
- Ahmadu Bello University, Zaria
- Federal University of Technology, Akure

Federal University of Technology, Minna. Nigeria.

=== India ===
In India, the Council of Architecture regulates the architectural education and maintains a registry of higher education institutions approved to offer a 2-year long Master of Architecture degree. While 5-year long Bachelor of Architecture degree allows a person to register with Council of Architecture as an architect and practice architecture in India, Master of Architecture is often required to teaching architecture at the collegiate level.

=== Iran ===
Some universities in Iran with accredited Master of Architecture degree programs are listed below:

- Tehran University
- Shahid Beheshti University (SBU)
- Iran University of Science and Technology
- Tarbiat Modares University (TMU)
- University of Guilan
- Tabriz Islamic Art University
- Yazd University
- University of Shahrood
- Islamic Azad University
- Sooreh University
- Shiraz University

== Schools and universities in Europe ==
=== Austria ===
- Academy of fine Arts, Vienna Institute for Art and Architecture (B.Arch. and M.Arch. language: German and English) (Austria)

=== Bosnia and Herzegovina ===
- University of Sarajevo Faculty of Architecture (B.Arch. and M.Arch. language: Bosnian and English)

=== Belgium ===
- WENK Gent Brussels (Sint Lucas Institute of Architecture) Sint Lucas Ghent Brussels in Belgium (language: English)

=== Denmark ===
- Royal Danish Academy of Fine Arts (M.A. Professional Degree, language: English)(Denmark)

=== Finland ===
- University of Oulu (M.S. Professional Degree, language: English)(Finland)
- University of Tampere (M.S. Professional Degree, language: English)(Finland)
- Aalto University (M.S. Professional Degree, language: English)(Finland)

=== Germany ===
- DIA Dessau (Dessau International Architecture) at the Hochschule Anhalt / Bauhaus Dessau in Germany (language: English)
- Hochschule Wismar (language: German and English) in Wismar, Germany

=== Ireland ===
- Cork Centre for Architectural Education (University College Cork/Munster Technological University)
- Technological University Dublin
- University College Dublin

=== Italy ===
- Politecnico di Torino - I Facoltà di Architettura I (Italy)
- Politecnico di Torino - II Facoltà di Architettura (Italy)

=== Liechtenstein ===
- Hochschule Liechtenstein (candidate for accreditation, language: English)

=== Netherlands ===
- TU Delft Faculty of Architecture (M.S. Professional Degree, language: English)
- Academy of Architecture at the Amsterdam School of Art
- Artez Academy of Architecture in Arnhem
- Academie van Bouwkunst Groningen
- Academie van bouwkunst Maastricht
- The Rotterdam Academy of Architecture and Urban Design
- TU Eindhoven Faculty of Architecture, Building and Planning (M.S. Professional Degree, language: English)

=== Poland ===
- Warsaw University of Technology Architecture and Urban Planning with specialisation Architecture for Society of Knowledge (M.Arch. language: English) (Poland)
- Cracow University of Technology Department of Architecture with specialisation Architecture and Urban Planning (M.Arch. RIBA accredited) (Poland)
- Wroclaw University of Science and Technology Faculty of Architecture

(M.Arch. language: English) (Poland)

=== Serbia ===
- University of Belgrade Architecture and Urban Planning (M.Arch. RIBA accredited)(M.Arch. language: Serbian, English)
- University of Novi Sad Architecture (M.Arch. language: Serbian, English)

=== Slovenia ===
- University of Ljubljana Architecture and Urban Planning (M.Arch. language: English) (M.I.A. Language: Slovenian)

=== Spain ===
- Universidad de Navarra Department of Architecture (M.D.A. language: Spanish and English) (Spain)
- The University of the Basque Country The University of the Basque Country (M.D.A. Language: Basque or Spanish) (Basque Country, Spain)

=== Switzerland ===
- Jointmaster of Architecture in Berne, Fribourg and Geneva, (languages: English and French) (Switzerland)
- Accademia di Architettura di Mendrisio (Switzerland)
- Academie van Bouwkunst Tilburg (the Netherlands)

=== United Kingdom ===
All M.Arch courses listed below comply with RIBA and ARB accreditation, complying to RIBA's Part 2 stage before Part 3 and Architect registry.

England

- University of Leeds, School of Civil Engineering, Architecture MArch or Architecture MArch, MEng
- University of Bath, Department of Architecture and Civil Engineering, Bath, as MArch
- Birmingham City University, Birmingham School of Architecture, Birmingham, as MArch
- Arts University Bournemouth, Bournemouth, as MArch
- University of Brighton, Brighton, as MArch
- University of the West of England (UWE Bristol), Bristol, as MArch
- University of Cambridge, Department of Architecture, Cambridge as MPhil
- The University of Creative Arts, Canterbury School of Architecture, as MArch
- The University of Kent (Canterbury), Kent School of Architecture, as MArch
- The University of Huddersfield, School of Art, Design and Architecture. as M.Arch or M.Arch (International)
- Leeds Beckett University, School of Arts, as MArch or Level 7 Architecture Apprenticeship.
- De Montfort University, The Leicester School of Architecture, Leicester, as March or Level 7 Architecture Apprenticeship.
- University of Lincoln, The Lincoln School of Architecture, Lincoln, as MArch
- University of Liverpool, Liverpool School of Architecture, Liverpool, as MArch
- Liverpool John Moores University, Liverpool, as MArch
- Architectural Association School of Architecture, London, as Final Examination
- The London School of Architecture as MArch
- The University College of London, The Bartlett School of Architecture, as MArch
- The University of Arts, London, Central Saint Martins College of Art and Design, London, as MArch
- The University of East London, School of Architecture, Computing and Engineering, as March
- The University of Greenwich London, School of Architecture, Design and Construction, London, as MArch
- Kingston University London, Kingston School of Art, London, as MArch
- London Metropolitan University, School of Art, Architecture and Design, as MArch or Level 7 Architect Apprenticeship
- Royal College of Art, School of Architecture, as MA
- London South Bank University, Engineering, Science and the Built Environment, as MArch or Level 7 Architect Apprenticeship
- The University of Westminster, Department of Architecture, as M.Arch
- University of Manchester and Manchester Metropolitan University, The Manchester School of Architecture, as MArch or Level 7 Architect Apprenticeship
- The University of Newcastle upon Tyne, School of Architecture, Planning and Landscape, Newcastle, as M.Arch
- Northumbria University, Architecture Department, School of the Built Environment, Newcastle upon Tyne, as MArch orLevel 7 Architect Apprenticeship
- The University of Nottingham, Architecture and Built Environment, Nottingham, as MArch
- Nottingham Trent University, School of Architecture, Design and the Built Environment. as M.Arch
- Oxford Brookes University, School of Architecture, Oxford, as M.ARchD
- University of Central Lancashire (UCLAN), (Preston) The Grenfell-Baines School of Architecture, Construction and Environment, as MArch
- RIBA Studio, as Diploma
- The University of Plymouth, Plymouth School of Architecture, Design and Environment, Plymouth, as M.Arch
- The University of Portsmouth, Portsmouth School of Architecture, Portsmouth, as MArch
- The University of Sheffield, Sheffield School of Architecture, Sheffield, as MArch
- Sheffield Hallam University, Department of Architecture and Planning, Sheffield, as M.Arch

Northern Ireland

- The Queen's University Belfast as MArch
- The University of Ulster as MArch

Scotland

- University of Dundee as MArch (with Honours)
- University of Edinburgh, The Edinburgh College of Art, MArch
- University of Strathclyde (Glasgow) as PgDip or MArch
- Glasgow School of Art, Mackintosh School of Architecture, as MArch
- Robert Gordon University, The Scott Sutherland School of Architecture & Built Environment, via BSc/MArch (Integrated Degree) or MArch
- Duncan of Jordanstone College of Art and Design as MArch

Wales

- Cardiff University, Welsh School of Architecture, via BSc/MArch (Integrated Degree) or MArch

== Schools and universities in the Middle East ==
- Technion Department of Architecture (M.Arch. language: English) (Israel)
- Bezalel Academy of Art and Design Department of Architecture (B.Arch. language: Hebrew) (Israel)
- Ariel University Department of Architecture (B.Arch. language: Hebrew) (Israel)
- Middle East Technical University Department of Architecture (M.Arch. language: English) (Turkey)
- Mimar Sinan Fine Arts University (B.Arch. and M.Arch. language: Turkish) (Turkey)
- King Saud University, College of Architecture and Planning (B.Arch) (Saudi Arabia)

== See also ==
- Bachelor of Architecture
- Doctor of Architecture
- National Council of Architectural Registration Boards
