= Shannon Christensen =

American architect

Shannon Christensen is an American architect.

== Education and career ==
She has a Master of Architecture degree from Montana State University and formerly served on the University’s School of Architecture Advisory Council. In 2009 she became AIA Montana’s Architect Licensing Advisor. She was also the Architects In Action/State Government Network Representative from 2021-2023. In the past, Christensen has held the roles of: Associate Director (AIA Montana), Young Architect Regional Director (AIA Northwest and Pacific Region) and a member of the Internship Advisory Committee and Education Committee of NCARB.

== Awards and recognitions ==
In 2015 she was honored as one of "40 Under Forty" top young professionals by the Billings Gazette and in the same year was recognized by the National Council of Architectural Registration Boards as one of the "13 Must Follow Twitter Accounts for Aspiring Architects." In 2016 she was one of the youngest ever architects to become Associate Principal at Architects Engineers. In 2017 she received the Young Architects Award.
