= Latta House =

Latta House may refer to:

in the United States (by state then city)

- May-Latta House, Prestonsburg, Kentucky, listed on the National Register of Historic Places (NRHP) in Floyd County
- E. D. Latta Nurses' Residence, Asheville, North Carolina, listed on the NRHP in Buncombe County
- Latta House (Huntersville, North Carolina), listed on the NRHP in Mecklenburg County
- Rev. M.L. Latta House, Raleigh, North Carolina, NRHP-listed
- Latta House (Dyersburg, Tennessee), NRHP-listed
