= Harry G. Robinson III =

American architect

- Born: January 18, 1942 (age 84); Washington, D.C., U.S.
- Occupation: Architect
- Parent(s): Gwendolyn H. Robinson; Harry G. Robinson Jr.
- Awards: Whitney M. Young Jr. Award (1990); Ely Distinguished International Educator Award (1991); NOMA Honor Award (1991) and Special Award (1992); D.C. Chapter, American Institute of Architects Centennial Medal; D.C. Council of Engineering and Architecture Societies Architect of the Year; D.C. Hall of Fame (2006); Howard University Distinguished Postgraduate Achievement (2008); D.C. chapter, Tau Sigma Delta Silver Medal

Harry G. Robinson III (born January 18, 1942) is an American architect, and professor of architecture and Dean Emeritus of the School of Architecture and Design at Howard University in Washington, D.C. He was a member of the U.S. Commission of Fine Arts from 1994 to 2003, and served as its chairman from 2002 to 2003. He is also the first African American to be elected president of the National Architectural Accrediting Board, and the first African American elected president of the National Council of Architectural Registration Boards.

== Early life and career ==
Robinson was born at Freedman's Hospital on January 18, 1942, in Washington, D.C., to Harry G. Robinson, Jr. and Gwendolyn Herriford Robinson. He had an older sister, Joan. His family was intricately connected with Howard University, which was near the college's campus. His great-grandfather, James Henry Hill, joined the faculty at Howard University in 1879. His grandmother, Mamie Hill Robinson, graduated from Howard's teachers college in 1887. His father was born in 1908 in a home where Howard University's William H. Greene Stadium now stands. His father often boasted of being "born on Howard's 50 yard line". His grandmother later sold the property to the university for $10.

Robinson's father graduated from Howard in 1934, and played varsity basketball there. His mother worked at the Howard University school of dentistry, his aunt taught social work there, and Colonel James Hill Robinson (his uncle and a graduate of the United States Military Academy) was an associate dean of architecture there when Robinson was an undergraduate. Another 24 family members also attended Howard. Robinson was nicknamed "Butch" while growing up. Robinson's early years were spent living in an apartment at 2715 Georgia Avenue NW near Howard University (across the street from his grandparents' home). Robinson often played on the campus, riding a wagon down and sledding on its hills, and learning to swim in its pool. When he entered James Monroe Elementary School, the family moved north to Farragut Street NW. He attended Benjamin Banneker Junior High School (now Benjamin Banneker Academic High School), a racially segregated, all-black school, in 1953. But after the Supreme Court's 1954 decision in Brown v. Board of Education, 347 U.S. 483, he attended racially integrated MacFarland Junior High School.

Robinson graduated from Howard University in 1966 with a Bachelor of Architecture degree (with design honors). Robinson joined the United States Army after graduation, became an officer, and served a tour of duty as a 2nd Lieutenant engineer in Vietnam in 1967 during the Vietnam War. He received the Bronze Star Medal and a Purple Heart, and promoted to first lieutenant. He received his Master of City Planning (MCP) from Howard in 1970. He then enrolled at Harvard University, where he obtained an MCP in urban design in 1972 from the Graduate School of Design.

Robinson began his career working as an urban planner for the D.C. Redevelopment Land Agency (RLA) from 1968 to 1972.

== Teaching career ==
Robinson's teaching career began when he taught architecture at the University of the District of Columbia from 1969 to 1970 and again from 1971 to 1974.

He then taught architecture at Morgan State College in Baltimore, Maryland, from 1972 to 1979. At the time of his departure, he was associate dean of urban planning. While at Morgan State, Robinson received several federal grants to study urban planning, and developed graduate programs in architecture and urban planning. Morgan State became the first historically black college or university to be recognized by the American Institute of Planners. He founded and was director of the Center for Built Environment Studies, an interdisciplinary program in architecture, city planning, landscape architecture, and urban design.

Robinson came to teach at Howard University after delivering a lecture there in February 1979. Impressed with his knowledge and force of personality, students formed a committee to investigate his background, then met with faculty to discuss their findings. The joint student-faculty group then petitioned Howard University President James E. Cheek to hire Robinson as the next dean of the School of Architecture and Planning. Robinson joined Howard in September 1979. During his tenure as dean, he expanded the curriculum, organized the African American Architect Initiative, and established a program to encourage D.C. schoolchildren to choose a career in urban design and planning. Robinson has long advocated equal access for African-American architects, but argues that black architects should seek work where they can get it. "I don't want to ask for anything. It's embarrassing to me," he told Newsday in 1991. "I have a new sense of being a radical. I really had to, with the barrage of negative press and complaints of what we don't have. I'm tired of it. ... We simply aren't going to get large corporate work. That's a different network. But we have our own network. We have the black church, we have the black sororities and fraternities. Of course we want equal access, but no profession is without its barriers."

Robinson was named Howard University's Interim Vice President for Academic Affairs and Vice President for University Administration in 1995. During this time, he sponsored a process to craft a campus master plan. The plan, called "UniverCity 20/20," neared completion in 1997. When Howard Hall was renovated in 1996, he saved bricks and wood from the historica building to sell as fund-raisers for the university capital campaign. Robinson planned an extensive campaign to educate university alumni about Howard University's history as a means of engaging them in his fund-raising drive. Many alumni and students, he said, did not have a clear understanding of how unique Howard is. "I tell the students every fall, 'If you just want an education, go home and go to a fine state school.'" Robinson stepped down as Interim Vice President for Academic Affairs in 1997. He continued at Howard as the James E. Silcott Professor of Architecture.

== Government service ==
Robinson is a long-time member of the board of directors of the Vietnam Veterans Memorial Fund, which helped to build and now maintains the Vietnam Veterans Memorial. In 1981, when the memorial's Memorial Wall design was approved by the memorial jury, controversy erupted over the Minimalist design. In January 1982, a new element—a realistic bronze sculpture by Frederick Hart known as The Three Soldiers—was added to the memorial. In October 1982, the Commission of Fine Arts approved the erection of a flagpole to be grouped with The Three Soldiers. Controversy continued over both how close The Three Soldiers should be to the Memorial Wall, and whether the flagpole should be erected. Robinson opposed putting the statues near the wall, saying this "would impose its imagery upon the visitor's experience and weaken the impact..." He criticized the flagpole as "an intrusion into the tranquil horizontal space of the meadow and the awe-inspiring quality of the wall."

Robinson was appointed a member of the U.S. Commission of Fine Arts in 1994 and served until 2003. He was the commission's vice chairman from 2000 to 2002, and its chairman from 2002 to 2003. Robinson was a member of the CFA during the contentious decision over the siting of the National World War II Memorial in the 1990s. Robinson strongly endorsed a proposal to put the memorial in a traffic circle on Columbia Island at the foot of Arlington Memorial Bridge. He also voiced strong views about the Washington Metro's decision to place glass-and-steel canopies over all Metro station entrances. When Metro brought its design before the CFA, Robinson said, "Not only is it dull, it's offensive." Robinson led the commission in strongly criticizing the canopies. "Metro cannot build what they have shown us," he said in July 2000. "It isn't going to happen." Robinson was similarly dismissive of a 2002 plan by the National Park Service to build a 20,000-square-foot (1,900 m^{2}) underground visitors center and 400-foot (120 m) long tunnel beneath the grounds of the Washington Monument. Robinson and the CFA had unanimously endorsed the plan in December 2001, but voiced strong doubts about it in May 2002. "Maybe the best tourist experience of the Washington Monument is not by walking through a tunnel into it," Robinson said, concluding that little security was achieved by forcing people to walk through a tunnel beneath the monument. The Park Service withdrew the plans. Robinson had high praise for the headquarters of the United States Institute of Peace, however. Moshe Safdie's design for a seven-story structure shaped like a curving capital letter V, enclosing a vast atrium covered by wing-like white canopies, was the architect's first American building. Robinson called the building an "exciting, exuberant statement of the importance of peace."

In December 1995, Robinson was named chairman of a 14-member ad hoc panel established by President Bill Clinton to propose a redesign of the closed segment of Pennsylvania Avenue NW between the White House and Lafayette Square. The panel proposed a "town square" idea that would remove the pavement and plant a field of grass, as well as add retail, food service, and educational kiosks to make the area a more attractive gathering place. Unsightly security barriers would be replaced with more decorative planters, access points to Lafayette Square would be widened into better gateways to the park, star-like paving would be used throughout the park, and tour buses would be banned from the area. The panel's design plan extended these decorative motifs several blocks in every direction from the White House. But the National Park Service rejected the interim plan in favor of a long-term design. (As of 2012, no long-term plan has been proposed.)

== Other roles ==
Robinson co-founded TRG Consulting in 1976, and remained with the firm as of 2009.

Robinson is a founding director of the Washington Arts Consortium, was a trustee and secretary of the National Building Museum, and a trustee of the Cooper–Hewitt, National Design Museum. He is also an advisor to the National Underground Railroad Freedom Center. In 1995, Robinson led the UNESCO International Commission on the Goree Memorial and Museum, which selected architects to design the House of Slaves museum and memorial on the island of Gorée, off the coast of Dakar, Senegal.

Robinson served three three-year terms as chairman of the District of Columbia Board of Architecture and Interior Design, and is a former member of the Board of Professional Responsibility for the District of Columbia Court of Appeals.

He is also a past president of the National Architectural Accrediting Board and the National Council of Architectural Registration Boards. He is the first African American to be elected to both of these positions.

Robinson was a director of Scenic America, a member of the Committee for the Preservation of the White House, and a member of the Architectural Research Institute. He is a director of the White House Historical Association, a member of the board of trustees of the Kennedy Center for the Performing Arts, and previously served on the National Research Council's Committee of High Performance Sustainable Federal Buildings.

In 2010, Robinson was named an executive consulting architect for the American Battle Monuments Commission. He was the first African American to serve in this position.

Robinson is a member of the Committee of 100 on the Federal City.

== Honors and professional positions ==
Robinson was a 1969–1970 Martin Luther King, Jr. Fellow at the Woodrow Wilson Foundation, and a 1969-1970 United States Department of Transportation Urban Transportation Research Fellow. In 1991, he received a partial Fulbright Fellowship to study at Copperbelt University in Kitwe, Zambia. He is a Fellow of the American Institute of Architects, and holds honorary membership in the Colegio de Arquitectos de Mexico, Sociedad de Arquitectos Mexicanos, and the Trinidad and Tobago Institute of Architects.

Robinson is the recipient of numerous awards. Robinson won the American Institute of Architects' Whitney M. Young Jr. Award in 1990. He received the Richard T. Ely Distinguished International Educator Award from the Lambda Alpha International honorary society for the advancement of land economics in 1991. He was given the Honor Award from the National Organization of Minority Architects in 1991, and a special award in 1992. Hampton University bestowed its 125th Anniversary Citation for Leadership In Architecture on him in 1993. In 2003, Robinson received the Centennial Medal of the Washington Chapter of the American Institute of Architects (the organization's highest honor). He is a recipient of the District of Columbia Council of Engineering and Architecture Societies Architect of the Year award and the Howard University College of Engineering, Architecture and Computer Science Distinguished Alumni Award for International Leadership. He was inducted into the Washington, D.C., Hall of Fame in 2006. Howard University honored him with the Distinguished Postgraduate Achievement award, the highest alumni honor bestowed by the university, in 2008. He also received the Silver Medal from the D.C. chapter of the Tau Sigma Delta Architectural Honor Society.

== Publications ==
In 1997, Robinson and Hazel Ruth Edwards co-authored The Long Walk: The Placemaking Legacy of Howard University, a history of Howard University with a special focus on its campus.

== Personal life ==
Robinson is married to local radio station executive Dianne Robinson. They have three daughters: Erin, Leigh, and Kia.
