= Architectural Experience Program =

Formerly called the Intern Development Program (IDP), the Architectural Experience Program (AXP) is designed to ensure that candidates pursuing licensure in the architecture profession gain the knowledge and skills required for the independent practice of architecture. The program is developed, maintained, and administered by the National Council of Architectural Registration Boards (NCARB) and is required by most U.S. architectural registration boards to satisfy experience requirements for licensure.

== History ==
In 1976, NCARB introduced the Intern Development Program (IDP) after working with the American Institute of Architects (AIA) throughout the 1970s to develop a more structured program for candidates to ensure they were gaining the knowledge and skills necessary to practice independently. Administered by NCARB, jurisdictions gradually began adopting the program to satisfy their experience requirement.

Mississippi became the first state to require the IDP in 1978. All 54 U.S. jurisdictions accept the IDP toward the fulfillment of their experience requirement.

The first major change to the program came in 1996 when it became required to record actual training units earned rather than the percentage of time spent in each training area. The program has been monitored annually by NCARB’s Internship Committee, which has recommended other minor changes over the years based on interpretations of the current practice of architecture.

In May 2009, NCARB announced the rollout of IDP 2.0, the most significant update to the program since its inception in the 1970s. IDP 2.0 more closely aligns the program's requirements with the current practice of architecture and ensures the comprehensive training that is essential for competent practice.

IDP 2.0 was developed in response to the 2007 Practice Analysis of Architecture. In this study, almost 10,000 practicing architects completed an extensive electronic survey to identify the tasks, knowledge, and skills that recently licensed architects, practicing independently, need in order to protect the health, safety, and welfare of the public.

The updates were rolled out in phases with the first phase occurring in July 2009 and the final in April 2012. In July 2015, the IDP was streamlined to reduce experience hours required from 5,600 to 3,740.

In order to address the findings of the 2012 Practice Analysis, NCARB began an in-depth review and overhaul of the experience program to ensure that the requirements continued to adhere to current architectural practice. In addition, NCARB decided to rename the IDP the Architectural Experience Program (AXP) as part of an effort to sunset the term “intern.”

The introduction of the new name and the overhaul were both launched on June 29, 2016. In the AXP, the previous 17 experience categories were realigned into six broad areas that reflect the current practice of architecture.

== Participants ==
An individual seeking architectural licensure is referred to as a “licensure candidate.” All U.S. states and Canadian provinces prohibit the use of the word “architect” from any person not already licensed to practice architecture. Most states and provinces also prohibit any derivation of the word architect as well.

A supervisor is someone who reviews and directs the work of others and ensures that work is done within acceptable levels of quality. An AXP supervisor is the individual who supervises a candidate on a daily basis. The AXP supervisor is required to certify that the information submitted on an experience report is true and correct.

A mentor is a loyal adviser, teacher, or coach. An AXP mentor must be a registered architect who makes a long-term commitment to a candidate’s professional growth. If possible, the mentor should not work in the same office so that the candidate can gain useful insight into the daily work experience.

== Eligibility ==
The first step to beginning the AXP is to establish an NCARB Record. Candidates are eligible to start earning credit for the AXP once they have graduated from high school. In order to gain experience, they must work under the direct supervision of an AXP supervisor in one of the NCARB-approved work settings.

All experience must be reported electronically to NCARB at least every eight months through their NCARB Record, and experience may be submitted more often. Half credit will be given for experience reported that is up to five years old.

== Experience Areas ==
Licensure candidates must acquire 3,740 experience hours across six experience areas to complete the AXP. These areas were effective June 2016.

=== Practice Management ===
Required hours: 160

Practice Management is where licensure candidates gain experience running an architecture firm—including the ins and outs of managing a business, marketing firms, securing projects, working with clients, and sustaining a positive and professional work environment.

=== Project Management ===
Required hours: 360

In Project Management, licensure candidates learn how to deliver projects that meet contractual requirements, so they’ll be prepared to budget, coordinate, oversee, and execute a project.

=== Programming & Analysis ===
Required hours: 260

Programming & Analysis is the first phase of a project, often referred to as pre-design. Licensure candidates will experience tasks related to researching and evaluating client requirements, building code and zoning regulations, and site data to develop recommendations on the feasibility of a project.

=== Project Planning & Design ===
Required hours: 1,080

Project Planning & Design covers the schematic design phase of a project. Licensure candidates will learn to layout the building design, review building codes and regulations, coordinate schematics with consultants, and communicate design concepts with clients.

=== Project Development & Documentation ===
Required hours: 1,520

In Project Development & Documentation, licensure candidates will gain experience with projects after the schematic design has been approved—focusing on construction documents and coordinating with regulatory authorities to gain the necessary approvals for construction.

=== Construction & Evaluation ===
Required hours: 360

In Construction & Evaluation, licensure candidates will get involved with the construction administration and post-construction phases of a project—this includes being out on the job site; meeting with contractors, clients, and building officials; and punching lists, leading to the completion of the project.

Total hours: 3,740

== Resources ==
AXP Guidelines: Produced by NCARB, the document is essential reading for participants of the AXP. It includes steps to completing the program, reporting procedures, training requirements, and core competencies that should understand before becoming licensed. The document is updated about twice a year.

Architect Licensing Advisor: An individual who provides information and guidance for those working toward licensure. Licensing advisors are usually located at:

- NAAB-accredited architectural degree programs
- AIA chapters
- AIAS chapters
- Firms
- State registration boards

You can find your local architect licensing advisor through the NCARB website.

== See also ==
- Architect
- Intern architect
- National Council of Architectural Registration Boards
- American Institute of Architecture Students
- Intern Architect Program
- Architect Registration Examination
