= Ann R. Chaintreuil =

American architect

Ann R. Chaintreuil (born June 10, 1947) is an American architect and co-founder of an architectural firm.

== Early life ==
Chaintreuil was born at Genesee Hospital on June 10, 1947, in Rochester, New York, to John Urquhart Ross and Janet Getman Ross. She had an older brother, John.

Chaintreuil's parents met and married in Havana, Cuba on April 27, 1929. They later moved to Fairport, New York. Ann Chaintreuil attended Fairport Central Schools and East Rochester Junior-Senior High School, graduating in 1965.

== Education ==
Chaintreuil received her Bachelor of Fine Arts and Master of Architecture from Syracuse University in 1971. Chaintreuil also attended the Architectural Association School of Architecture in London, England

== Professional life ==
Chaintreuil was a founding partner of Chaintreuil Jensen Stark Architects, a New York-based architecture firm with locations in Rochester and Buffalo and Boca Raton, Florida. She was National Council of Architectural Registration Boards' first female president in 1997. Chaintreuil served as chair of the Architect Registration Examination Research and Development Subcommittee, which led the development of the first computer-based. Prior to the Research and Development Subcommittee, Chaintreuil served for 4 years on the NCARB committees preparing the nationally administered Architect Registration Examination. Architect Registration Examination. In 1994, she was elevated to the College of Fellows of the American Institute of Architects (FAIA).

== Personal life ==
Ann Ross Chaintreuil married Renier Frederick Chaintreuil January 24, 1970. They have three children, Renier John Chaintreuil born 1980, Alexander Ross Chaintreuil born 1984, and Taylor Ann Chaintreuil born 1991.
