= D'Arcy Jones =

Canadian architect

- Born: Fort St. John, British Columbia
- Education: University of Manitoba
- Occupation: Architect
- Practice: D'Arcy Jones Architects
- Website: https://www.darcyjones.com/

D’Arcy Jones is a Canadian architect and the founding principal of D’Arcy Jones Architects (DJA) (formerly known as D’Arcy Jones Architecture), a studio practice based out of Vancouver British Columbia, Canada. DJA's portfolio consists of completed and ongoing projects focusing greatly within their local area of British Columbia while some reside as far as Ontario, Washington, California, and Switzerland. D’Arcy Jones Architects focuses mainly on small scale boutique residential homes, many of which have brought national and international recognition for the practice.

== Early life and career ==
Although born in Fort St. John, British Columbia Jones spent his early life growing up in Abbotsford. From early on, Jones developed both an artistic interest in drawing and the physical act of building. Jones’ interest in physical design continued to grow during highschool grade 11 when he was enrolled in a class that taught drafting. This eventually drove him to pursue post secondary to achieve both a bachelors and a master's degree. In 1995, Jones received a bachelor's degree in Environmental Design at the University of Manitoba followed by a bachelor of Environmental Design Studies at the Technical University of Nova Scotia (TUNS)(which merged into what is now Dalhousie University) in 1997. Shortly after, he returned to the University of Manitoba where he completed his master's in Architecture in 1999.

During his time still as an undergrad student in university, Jones was already designing architecture that made its way into physical realization. His first real project was a commission done in 1996 by his own parents asking him to design their home. During this time, Jones claims that the project made him appreciate and “fall in love” with factors that were not taught in architecture school, such as the practical and technical characteristics of architecture. The success of this solo project caused him to find his own practice after graduating from master's in 1999, where he would officially start practicing alone from the years 2000-2005. During these early times as a solo practice, Jones was based out of his personal house located in Vancouver's west end.

Professionally, Jones followed a path that was considered abnormal and non-traditional. As typically seen in Canada (where he would eventually practice) and many other parts of the world, the licensing process remains very strict and orderly in terms of how to achieve official registration as a practicing architect. With respect to contemporary licensing, the process follows a structure where an individual with a master's of architecture degree will work under the title of ‘intern’ through already established firms. Instead, Jones founded his own practice, right after graduating in 1999 and has been self-employed ever since. Unlike in a normal intern employment situation where a registered architect will supervise and sign off on one's ‘working hours,’ Jones never traditionally interned and obtained his hours remaining as a solo practice by collaborations and joint ventures. He states in an interview that he used joint ventures with registered architects as a means to carry out projects and complete his ‘internship.’

After 5 years of solo practice, Jones moved the practice from his own home into an office space in Mount Pleasant in 2005. From here Jones officially founded D’Arcy Jones Architecture (currently known as D’Arcy Jones Architects) where he expanded his studio size to a humble 9 person team including himself. Although technically involved with architectural practice since the conception of his firm in 2000, Jones achieved being a registered architect in 2013.

As an established architect and practice, Jones actively involves himself and contributes within the field of architecture through talk panels, design competitions, lecturing, juries, and teaching. In 2015, Jones was taken on by the University of British Columbia to be an adjunct professor within their schools of Architecture and Landscape Architecture where things like studio teaching, critiquing and being a thesis advisor are carried out. Most recently, he was invited by the University of Calgary as a guest critic for students’ within the Faculty of Environmental Design.

== Notable projects ==
Friesen Wong House

The Friesen Wong House is a custom single family residential house that additionally features a pottery studio and shop area. The siting of the house takes place on a rocky hilltop that overlooks the topography of the surrounding Kalamalka Lake Provincial Park. The house was designed bespoke to cater towards the lifestyle of the owners Jon Friesen and Silping Wong. This meant a design integrated within nature that responded to their lifestyle surrounding heavily on outdoor activities. Jon states that the design was imagined to be an "extension of the park" where the house grew out of the land rather than being an object building that disrupted the landscape. Jon also states that the house was imagined to embody the surrounding park despite where you were located within the house, as if always "walking around the park." Jones ultimately responds to this design vision by translating the house into a sturdy and tough built form to respond to the site but also gracefully being sited within the landscape. The house focuses an emphasis on innovative sustainable and economic features. A prominent concrete cantilever structure together with structural insulated panel building technology (SIPS) was designed to work in tandem with small steel pins to help support the floor slab and ultimately create a thermal break to ensure a continuous insulation layer. Other structural innovations include a concrete block column that was used hollowed out to render a fireplace on the interior. On the interior, "saddlebag" storage units increase temperature control and have allowed cutback on glazing costs. For materiality, the house chooses to showcase its permanence with materials like steel, concrete, and charred wood that require little upkeep. The cladding was done in a Douglas Fir wood that is native to the region. Together with his father, Jon personally charred the wood using a technique called traditional Japanese wood preserving technique called shou sugi ban to protect against weathering and insect erosion.

The Frieson Wong House went on to win a handful of awards, most notably the Lieutenant Governor of British Columbia Awards in Architecture (2017).

Double Header House

The Double Header House is single residential housing project designed to house 3 generations of one family under one roof. The house is split into two main units: one housing the main family and kids, and the other housing the grandparents, and public and private access to both units through a communal staircase. This unique living condition was determined by the local zoning in Victoria BC that prevented the development of a duplex on the site, but instead allowed for a main building accompanied with a secondary suite. The plan layout consists of both living suites to be facing each other in a north-south orientation rather than a typical side-by-side layout seen in duplexes. This would allow both spaces to feel a sense of width close to a "typical house". What is most unique about the house is the origami like metal overhangs identical on both facades. This important design element helps mitigate sunlight coming into the house but still provides enough light into the interior. This overhang also helps with the privacy of people looking in.

Deep Cove House

The Deep Cove House is single residential house located in Deep Cove, North Vancouver. As Jones describes, the house was designed to be "part look-out tower, part courtyard and part land form." The house is sited on top a clifftop in Deep Cove where ultimately this multi-functioning form and program came to realization. The exterior of the house is designed with contrasting facades: the public street-facing one being completely closed off with no glazing versus the backside with extensive wrap-around windows. This is to allow for minimal views into the house from the public and nearby commercial streets and maximizes the expansive views overlooking the surrounding forest and water. The building's sharp angles also help combat and minimize exterior glare and promote water runoff. The interior was designed around a minimalist and modest yet flexible plan. This meant a simple grey-scale colour palette with minimalistic furniture. This was designed with inspiration from older architectural ideals of creating rooms with no given program and instead allow a multitude of programs/uses to form to a generic room. This would ultimately allow for the exterior views to be the highlight rather than interior.

The Deep Cove House was selected in 2019 as one of Dezeen's Top 10 Canadian Houses.

== Awards and achievements ==
D’Arcy Jones Architects has been the recipient of many awards and achievements. In recent years, the office together with many of their projects have been widely published and featured in books, journals, articles, magazines, and interviews.

The practice has received awards through the firm itself as well as the projects they have done. These include:

- RAIC Emerging Architectural Practice Award (2017) - A highly regarded award that recognizes firm principles and their representation of distinguished architectural projects. Criteria for such recognition includes project and design quality, innovations, public recognition and client service quality.
- AIBC Emerging Firm Award (2017)
- Ronald J. Thom Award for Early Design Achievement (2014) - presented to architects who showcase innovative talent and architectural potential in the field. Presented to architects who are in the earlier parts of their career.
- Lieutenant Governor of British Columbia Awards in Architecture (2017) - local award given to BC architects that recognizes design excellence in recently completed projects. In the case of this award, the Friesen Wong House was recognized.
- Arthur Erickson Memorial Award (2010) - the first year of this award conception, Jones won the award that honours Arthur Erickson who was a Canadian architect integral in Canadian architecture and someone who inspired many. Given to designers who are just emerging in recognition.
- Canadian Architect Award of Merit (2015) - award for the 'Ha-Ha House' project.
- Canadian Architect Award of Merit (2009) - award for 'The Cowboy' project.
