= Intern architect =

An intern architect or architectural intern is a person who is working professionally in the field of architecture in preparation for registration or licensure as an architect. An intern need not have attained a professional degree in architecture to begin accruing experience hours, but said degree is a prerequisite for licensure.

In the United States, Canada, and other countries, an intern architect is enrolled in a regulated program, such as the Intern Development Program (IDP) in the United States or the Intern Architect Program (IAP) in Canada, while working under the supervision of a licensed architect and preparing for professional registration exams.

The use of the title "architect" (or any derivation thereof) is legally protected in the United States, Canada, and other countries. Most U.S. states and all Canadian provinces, however, allow the use of the terms "intern architect" or "architectural intern" for a person enrolled in an architectural internship program.

== Intern Development Program (United States) ==
The Intern Development Program (IDP) is a national program, developed and administered by NCARB, in the United States designed to provide structured training for Intern Architects to ensure that they are exposed to most aspects of the architectural profession prior to attaining professional licensure.

A candidate works under the tutelage of one or more architects as mentor(s) on a regular basis. Additionally, the intern architect selects a sponsor, who is an architect who does not work for the firm where the intern is employed. Together, the mentor and the sponsor work with the intern to make sure that the intern is actively working towards satisfying the requirements of the IDP program.

The program prescribes the minimum experience hours required in various activities pertaining to practice in architecture before attaining professional licensure. Interns track these hours using experience reports that are verified and confirmed by their mentor. These activities fall into four categories: Pre-Design, Design, Project Management, and Practice Management, each of which includes tasks that architects will perform as part of their professional responsibilities. In total, interns must complete 5600 hours of reported experience before attaining professional licensure. In most states Interns may begin taking the Architect Registration Examination (ARE) while they are participating in the Intern Development Program, but will not attain professional licensure before successful completion of both the ARE and IDP.

=== History ===
The IDP was created jointly in the 1970s by the National Council of Architectural Registration Boards (NCARB) and the American Institute of Architects (AIA) and is administered by NCARB.

== Intern Architect Program (Canada) ==
The Intern Architect Program (IAP) is a national program in Canada that documents and evaluates internship activities, provides structure to the transition between education and registration, and encourages involvement of practitioners in the development of new architects. The IAP was established by the Committee of Canadian Architectural Councils (CCAC), which has representatives from each of the ten provincial associations of architects.

== See also ==
- Architect
- National Council of Architectural Registration Boards
- Intern Development Program
- Professional requirements for architects
