= William H. Lord =

American architect (1864–1933)

- Born: 1864; Syracuse, New York
- Died: July 27, 1933 (aged 69) near Salisbury, North Carolina
- Occupation: Architect

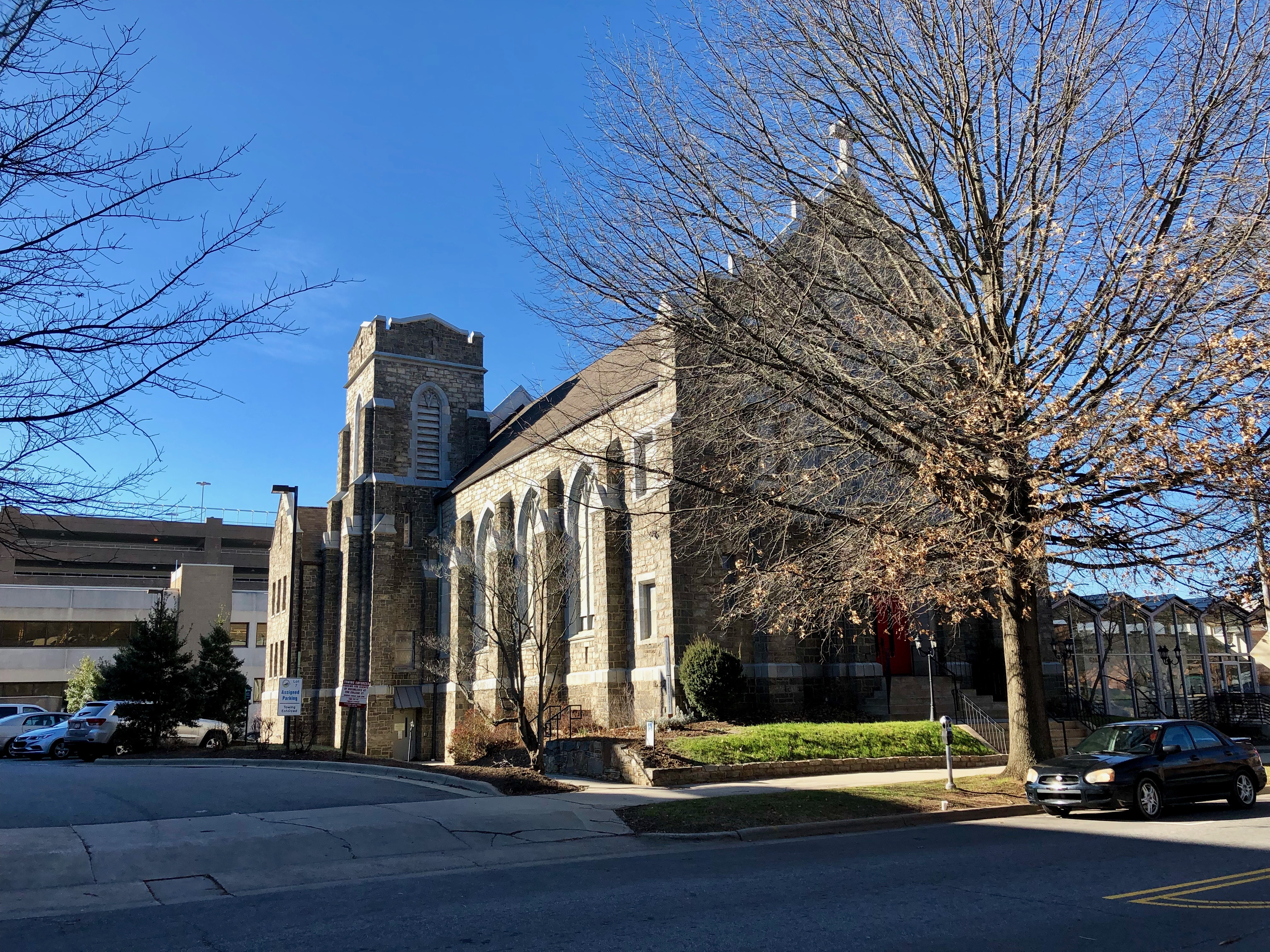
The First Congregational Church in Asheville, designed by Lord in the Gothic Revival style and completed in 1918.

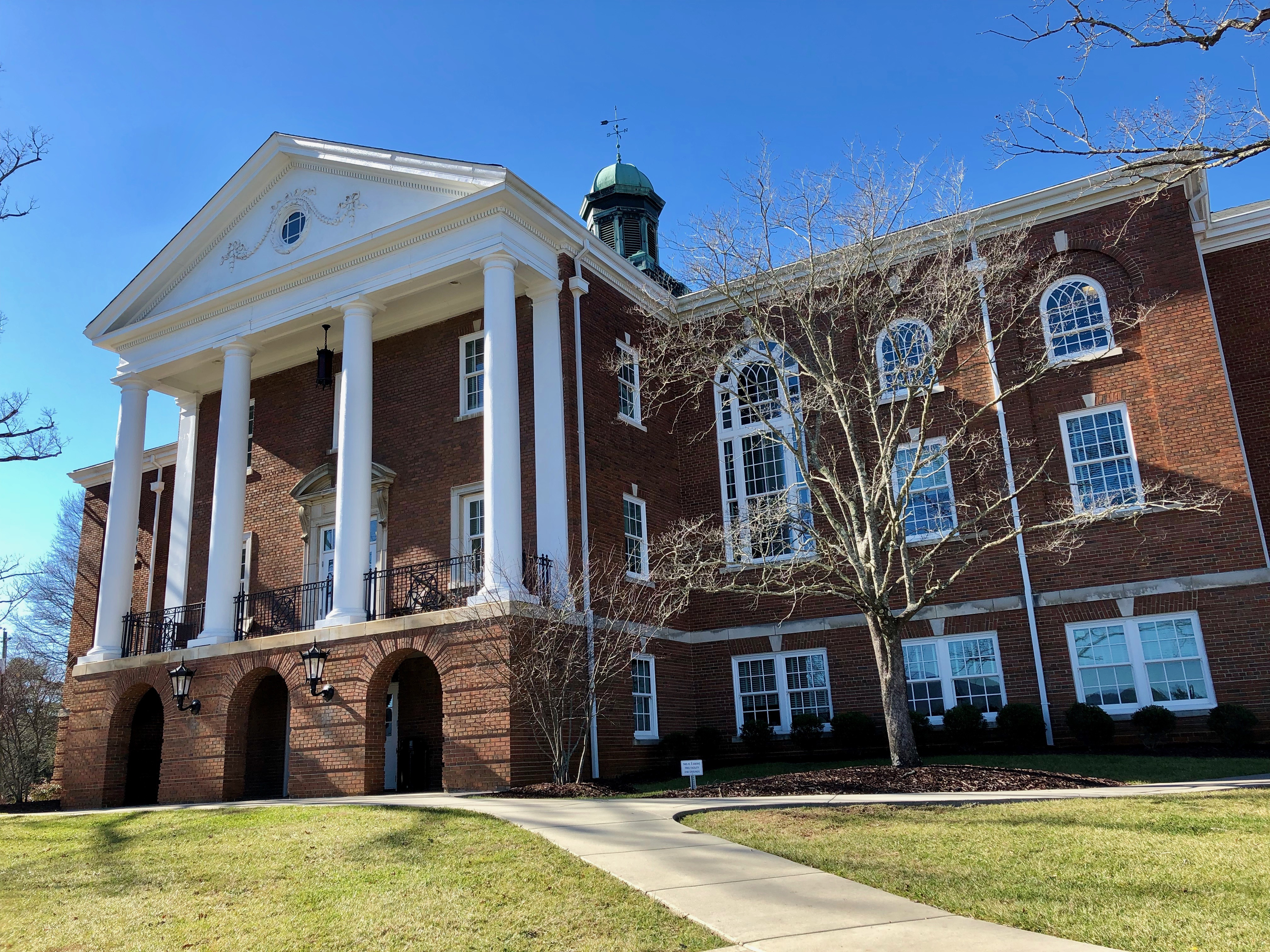
The former Biltmore High School in Asheville, designed by Lord in the Colonial Revival style and completed in 1927.

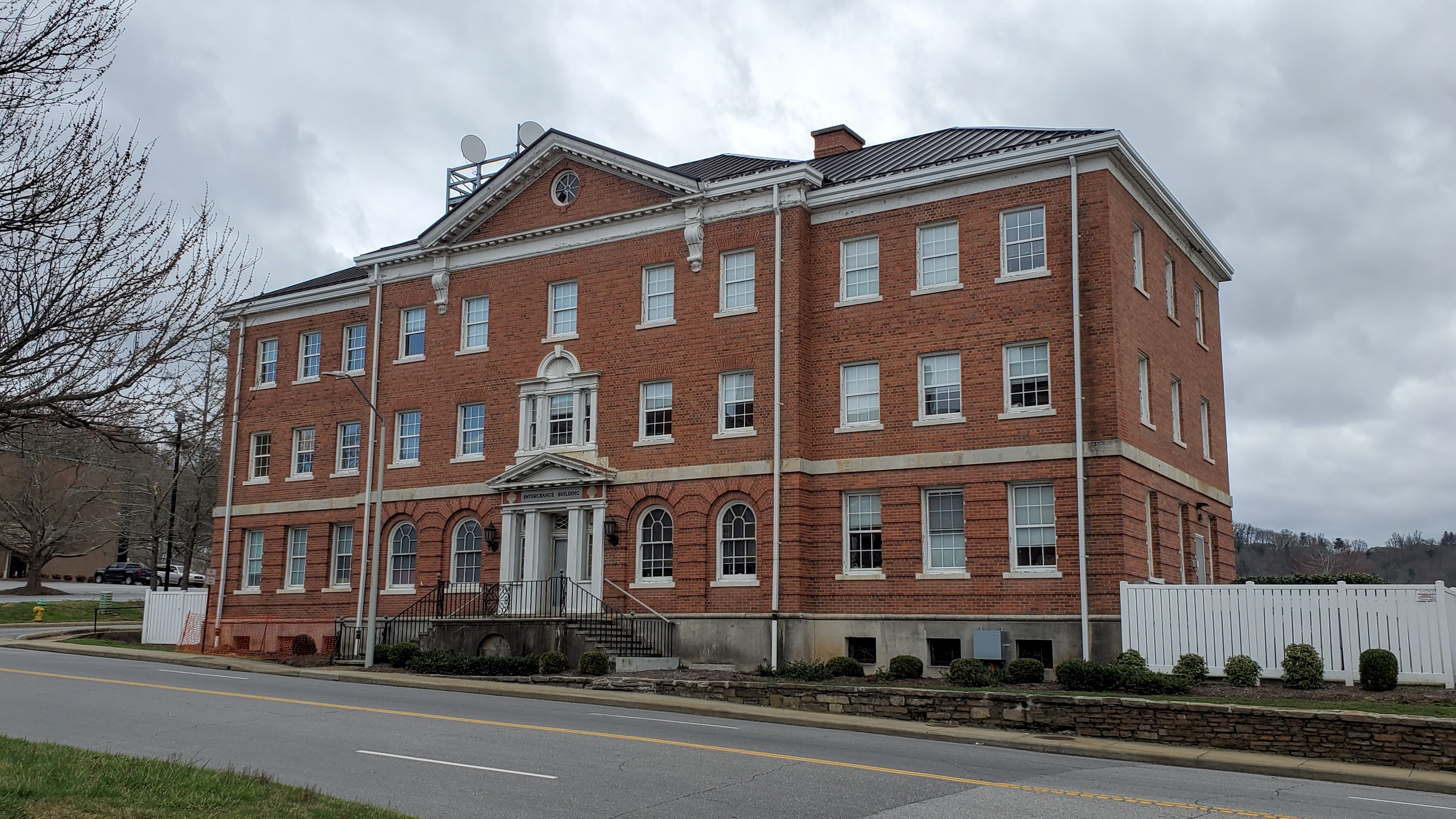
The former E. D. Latta Nurses' Residence in Asheville, designed by Lord & Lord in the Colonial Revival style and completed in 1930.

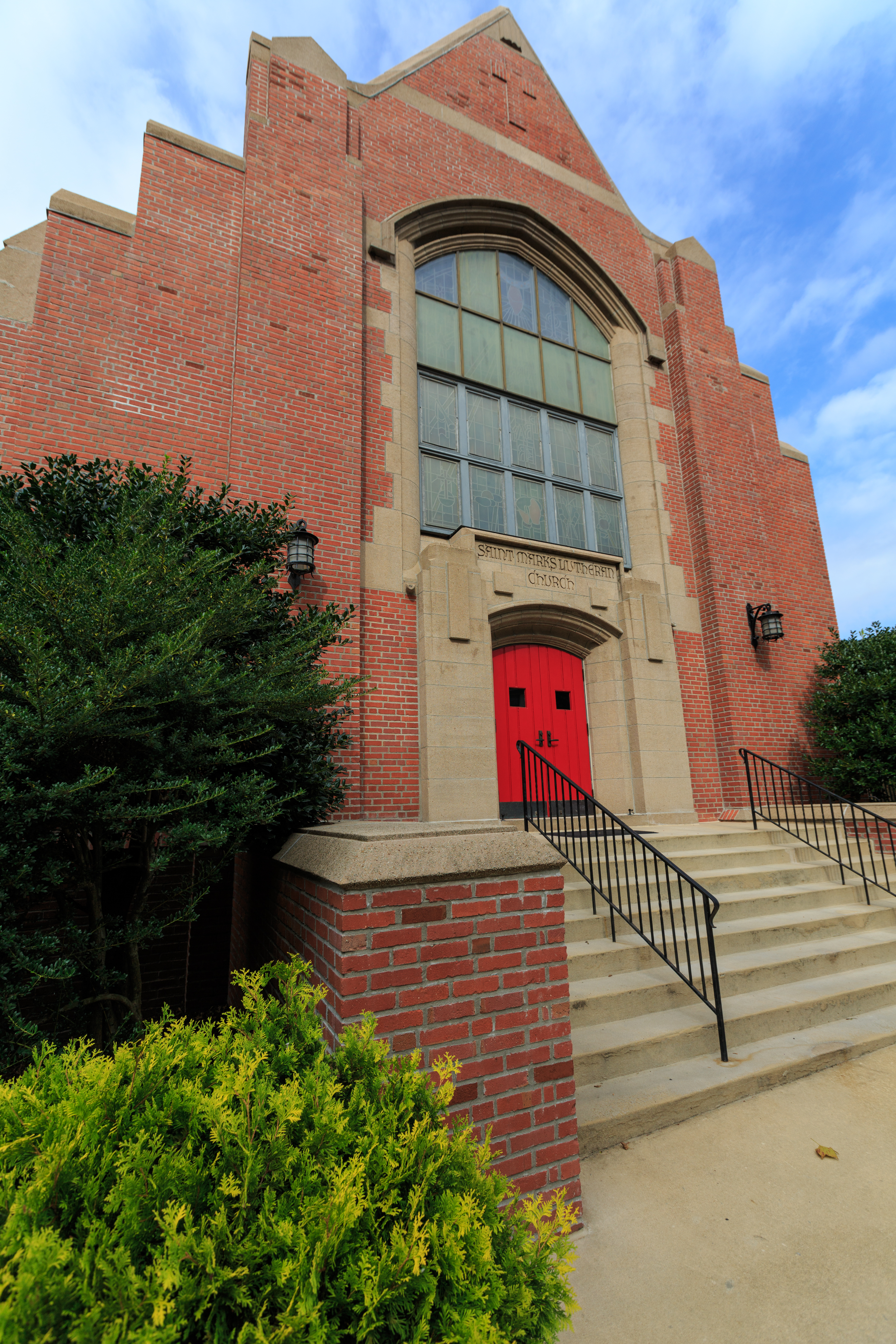
St. Mark's Lutheran Church in Asheville, designed by Lord & Lord in the Gothic Revival style and completed in 1932.

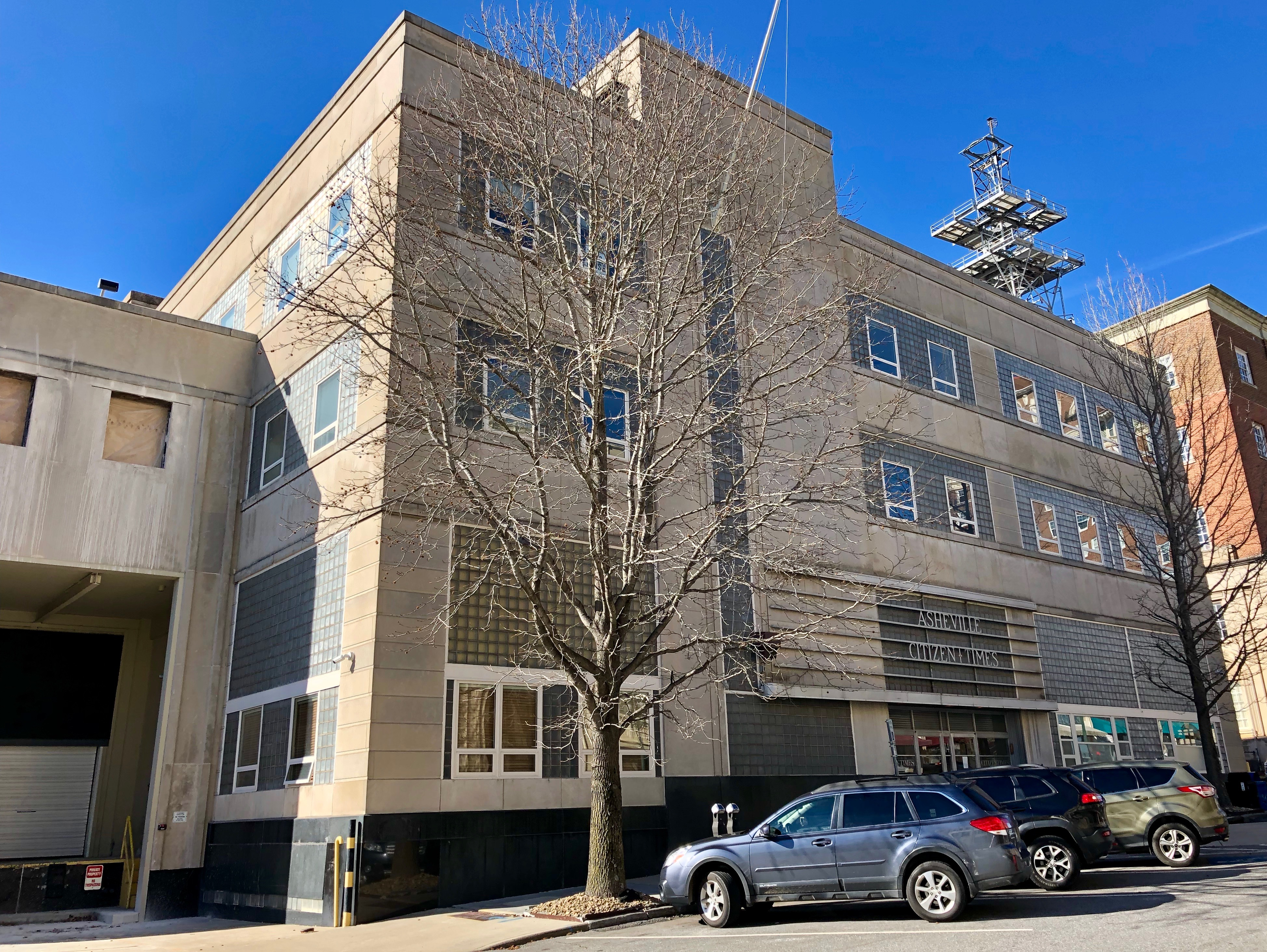
The Asheville Citizen-Times Building, designed by Anthony Lord in the Art Deco style and completed in 1939.

William H. Lord (1864 – July 27, 1933) was an American architect in practice in Asheville, North Carolina, from 1900 until his death in 1933. Lord was an important figure in the professionalization of the practice of architecture in North Carolina.

== Life and career ==
William Henry Lord was born in Syracuse, New York, in 1864. In Syracuse he worked for architect Asa L. Merrick until 1891, when he joined the federal government as an architect and superintendent of army posts. He and his wife spent winters in Asheville with her sister's family, and during that of 1899–1900, on the advice of local architect Richard Sharp Smith, he resigned from his government position and entered practice in Asheville. Lord was more conservative than contemporary Asheville architects Smith and Douglas Ellington and was known for his buildings designed on Beaux-Arts principles and in conservative revival styles. In 1929 Lord was joined in partnership by his son, Anthony Lord (February 17, 1900 – December 9, 1993), and the firm became Lord & Lord. Anthony Lord had earned a BFA in architecture from Yale University in 1927.

In 1913 Lord was a charter member of the North Carolina chapter (AIA North Carolina) of the American Institute of Architects (AIA) and served as chapter president from 1917 to 1921. In 1926 he was elected a Fellow of the AIA, the first from North Carolina. Lord was committed to raising standards of architectural practice and was instrumental in the 1915 passage of the North Carolina Architectural Practice Act, which legally defined the term "Architect" and established the Board of Architectural Registration and Examination, now the Board of Architecture, which set standards for the licensure of architects. This board was only the seventh such organization in the United States. He was also an early officer of the National Council of Architectural Registration Boards (NCARB) and served as its fourth president in 1927–28.

== Personal life ==
Lord was married in Chicago in 1896 to Helen Anthony of Poughkeepsie, New York. They had one child, Anthony. Lord was a charter member of the First Congregational Church (1918), the building of which he designed, and served as its treasurer until his death. He was otherwise a member of the Asheville Rotary and the Black Mountain Rod and Gun Club.

On June 26, 1933, Lord and his son attended the summer meeting of AIA North Carolina in Hickory. At the close of the meeting his son returned to Asheville while he remained for a meeting of the Board of Architectural Registration, at which he was elected president. He then left to visit relatives in Tarboro, driving part of the way with Greensboro architect Harry Barton. In the early morning of July 27, near Salisbury, another car collided with theirs, which burst into flames, killing Lord.

== Legacy ==
Anthony Lord continued his father's practice alone. In contrast with his father, he was a committed, though not doctrinaire, modernist. Of his few independent works the most important were the vernacular stone Dillingham Presbyterian Church (1934) in rural Buncombe County and the Asheville Citizen-Times Building (1939), designed in the Art Deco style with consulting architects and engineers Lockwood Greene. He was also employed as associate architect for the Sprinza Weizenblatt house (1941) in Asheville, designed by Marcel Breuer. While that house was under construction Lord was president of AIA North Carolina and invited Breuer to be the featured speaker at the chapter's annual meeting in 1941. In 1942 Lord and other local architects were having trouble gaining wartime government contracts, the only architectural work available. To try to win these contracts, Lord and five other architects from western North Carolina–William W. Dodge Jr., Henry I. Gaines, W. Stewart Rogers and Charles Waddell of Asheville and Erle G. Stillwell of Hendersonville–combined their firms and formed Six Associates. The association was loose until 1951, when it was formalized. Lord's most prominent work as a member of that firm was the D. Hiden Ramsey Library (1963) of the University of North Carolina at Asheville, designed in the New Formalist idiom of modernism. Lord was active in the firm until 1970, when he retired.

In 1988 Six Associates merged with Ellis/Naeyaert/Genheimer Associates of Troy, Michigan. The Asheville office was known as ENG/Six Associates, later simplified to ENG/6A. In 2000 that firm was acquired by Harley Ellington Design of Southfield to form Harley Ellis. In 2002 the Asheville office was bought by Calloway, Johnson, Moore & West of Winston-Salem, successors to the legacy of Willard C. Northup. That firm, known as CJMW since 2010, no longer maintains an Asheville office.

== Architectural works ==
- 1908 – Bryson City Bank Building, 16 Everett St, Bryson City, North Carolina
- 1912 – First Church of Christ, Scientist, 64 N French Broad Ave, Asheville, North Carolina
  - Designed by Solon Spencer Beman, architect, with William H. Lord, associate architect. A contributing resource to the NRHP-listed Downtown Asheville Historic District.
- 1913 – Trinity Episcopal Church, 60 Church St, Asheville, North Carolina
  - Designed by Bertram Grosvenor Goodhue of Cram, Goodhue & Ferguson, architects, with William H. Lord, associate architect. Lord added the parish house in 1921.
- 1915 – Hill Street School, Hill St, Asheville, North Carolina
  - Demolished.
- 1918 – Champion Fibre Company office building, Main St, Canton, North Carolina
- 1918 – First Congregational Church, 20 Oak St, Asheville, North Carolina
- 1919 – David Millard High School, Oak and College Sts, Asheville, North Carolina
  - Demolished.
- 1921 – Bryson Gymnasium, Warren Wilson College, Swannanoa, North Carolina
- 1923 – Florence Stephenson Hall, Asheville Normal School, Asheville, North Carolina
  - Demolished.
- 1925 – YWCA (former), 11 Grove St, Asheville, North Carolina
  - A contributing resource to the NRHP-listed Downtown Asheville Historic District.
- 1927 – Biltmore High School (former), 4 Vanderbilt Park Dr, Asheville, North Carolina
- 1930 – E. D. Latta Nurses' Residence, Mission Hospital (former location), 59 Woodfin Pl, Asheville, North Carolina
  - NRHP-listed.
- 1932 – St. Mark's Lutheran Church, 10 N Liberty St, Asheville, North Carolina
