= Examination for Architects in Canada =

Professional licensure examination for architects in Canada

The Examination for Architects in Canada, or ExAC, is a professional licensure examination for architects in most of Canada. It has been adopted by all of the Canadian Licensing Authorities. It is an alternative to the Architect Registration Examination maintained by the National Council of Architectural Registration Boards (NCARB).

The governing body for the ExAC is the Pan-Canadian ExAC Committee.

The first examination was held on November 17 & 18, 2008.

== Sections ==
The contents of each of the ExAC sections are as follows:

ExAC Section 1

- Programming
- Site and Environmental Analysis
- Cost Management
- Coordinating Engineering Systems
- Schematic Design
- Design Development

ExAc Section 2

- National Building Code 2020 Edition

ExAC Section 3

- Final Project

ExAC Section 4

- Bidding and Contract Negotiations
- Construction Phase - Office
- Construction Phase - Site
- Project Management

== See also ==
- Architecture of Canada
- Society for the Study of Architecture in Canada
- Canadian Centre for Architecture
