= American Institute of Architecture Students =

American nonprofit organization

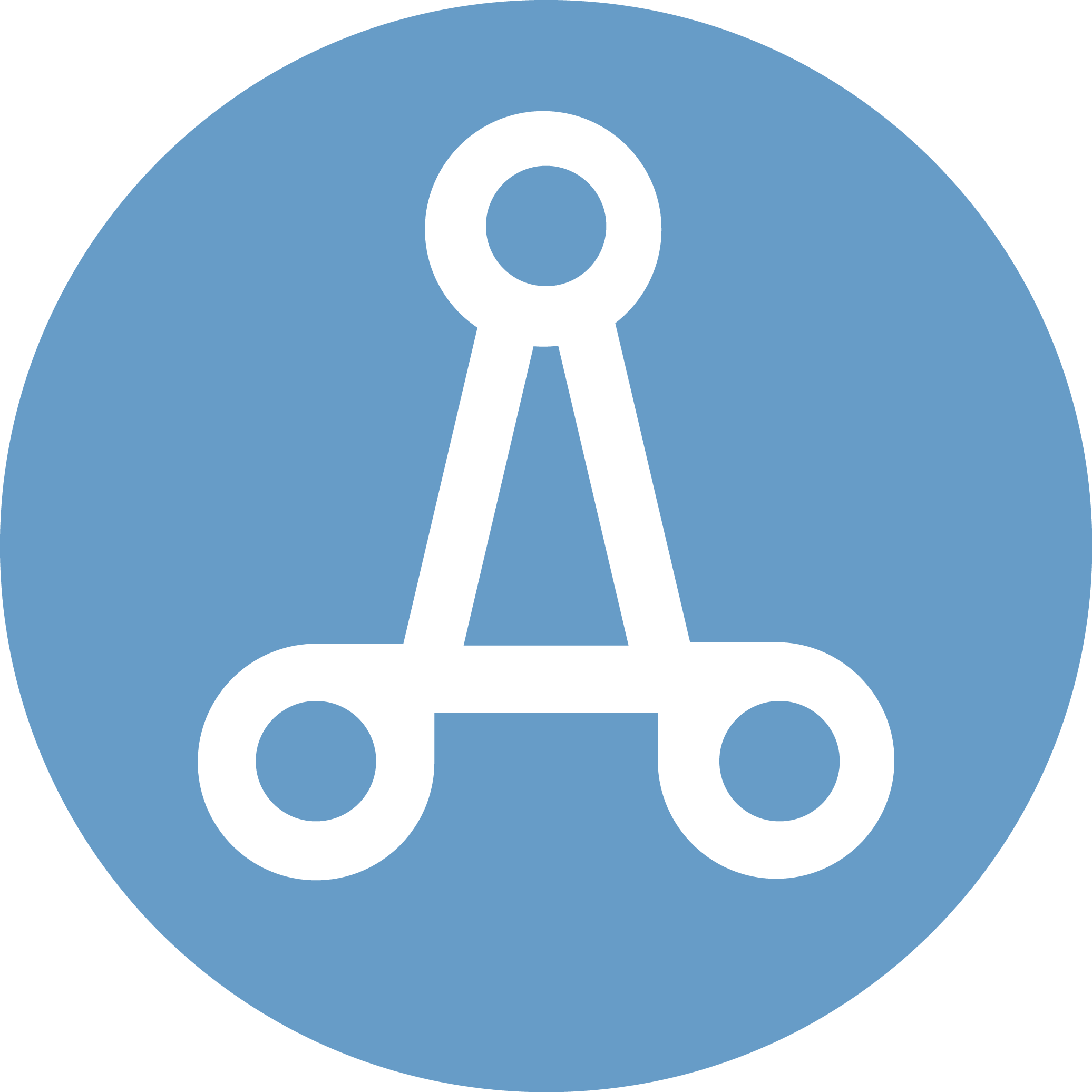
- Formation: 1956
- Founded at: Washington, D.C.
- Legal status: 501(c)3
- Purpose: Professional organization
- Location: 1735 New York Ave. NW Washington, DC
- Members: 6,000+ with over 100,000 alumni
- Publication: Crit
- Website: aias.org

The American Institute of Architecture Students (AIAS) is an independent, nonprofit, student-run organization that offers programs, information, and resources critical to architectural education. It primarily serves about 25,000 architecture students enrolled in accredited U.S. collegiate programs each year, with some international programs.

The organization represents one of five collateral organizations that govern the discipline of architecture in the United States, including allied organizations: the Association of Collegiate Schools of Architecture (ACSA), the National Architectural Accrediting Board (NAAB), National Council of Architectural Registration Boards (NCARB), and the American Institute of Architects (AIA). These governing bodies reflect the trajectory an architect will take during their career, from initial education, through licensure, and into practice.

AIAS publishes Crit, Journal of the AIAS (short for critique) and hosts events for students and professionals throughout the year, including FORUM, Grassroots Leadership Conference, and Quad Conferences. The organization was founded in 1956; it was originally called the National Architectural Student Association (NASA). Later the name changed to the Association of Student Chapters, AIA (ASC/AIA), before using its present-day name.

== History ==
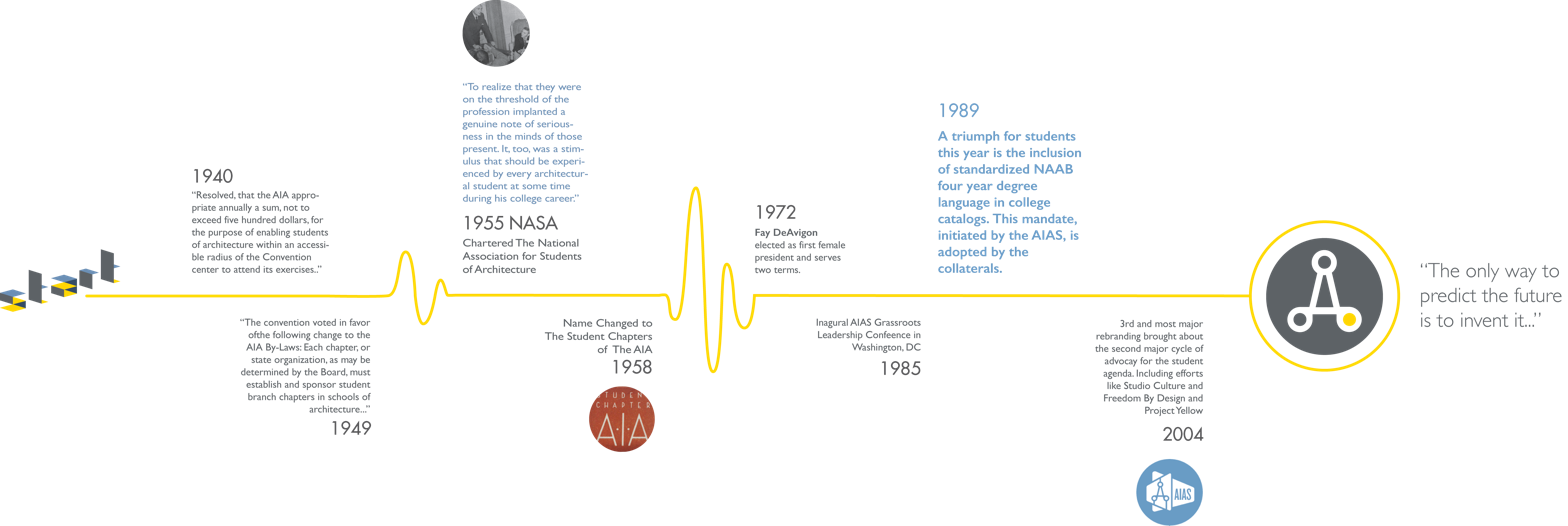
Timeline of AIAS History

=== NASA ===
In 1956, architecture students established the National Architectural Student Association (NASA). Chapters were established at all of the schools of architecture and a regional governance network was formed by the students at the first Student Forum. The students also elected Jim Barry (Rice Institute) as the first national president.

Jim Barry served as a part-time volunteer from his school with funding provided by the American Institute of Architects (AIA) and Washington-area architectural programs. During his term, NASA published the first issue of LINE magazine, had representatives involved on AIA committees and hosted programs at the Octagon. The members of NASA also attended AIA Convention in Los Angeles, with special programs designed specifically for students.

=== ASC/AIA ===
In 1958 the student organization was renamed the Association of Student Chapters, AIA (ASC/AIA), with the goal of bridging members to the AIA upon graduation. However, staff and leaders of the AIA were concerned about a separate student organization, believing it would conflict with the objective of encouraging students to maintain their memberships with both organizations. At the 1960 student convention at the University of California at Berkeley, the AIA board of directors proposed to abolish the ASC/AIA. John Richards, FAIA, then president of the AIA, stated, "[the student affiliations] of the past had not been as successful as had been hoped, and that it was feeling of the staff of the AIA that student organization structure was in need of improvement."

Students leaders lobbied to convince the AIA board of directors that the ASC/AIA chapter system was the foundation for the AIA and for the promotion of future generations entering architecture. Student president Charles Jones (University of Arizona) gave a speech to the General Session of the AIA on April 22, 1960, stating, "The students have no desire to make this organization so large that it becomes completely out of hand." However, the organization did grow. At the 1970 AIA Convention, student president Taylor Culver (Howard University) led a student revolt. Minutes of the meeting reported that Culver and his fellow students took over the podium held by the AIA president.

In 1972, two-term student president Fay D'Avignon (Boston Architectural Center) was elected the first female president of the organization, becoming the first ASC/AIA officer to take full-time responsibilities in Washington, DC. With increasing membership, the vice president was also found to be needed on a full-time basis in Washington, DC. In 1975 president Ella Hall (North Carolina State University) and vice president Steve Biegel (Syracuse University) became the first ASC/AIA national officers to work full-time in the National Office in Washington, D.C. The term for the national officers also changed to the July–June schedule, parallel to academic schedules.

The Cover of Crit02

1976–1977 team Jerry Compton (SCI-ARC) and Robert Rosenfeld (University of California, Berkeley) solidified the ASC/AIA growing operations budget, held the first design competition, published the magazine Telesis, and established student representation on the IDP Coordinating Committee. Rosenfeld named Crit, which launched the rebranded publication the following year.

The following year, Rosenfeld continued on as vice president, with Charles Guerin (University of Houston) as president. The two officers initiated the first ASC/AIA Chapter Honor Award and published the first issues of Crit.

In 1978 John Jeronimo (University of Miami) and Mary Beth Permar (Clemson University and the University of Illinois) collaborated on the continuation and improvement of Crit from a magazine format to a true architectural journal. Additionally, they increased the size of the board of directors to include the FORUM Chair and Crit Editor. The overall operating budget of the ASC/AIA passed the $100,000 mark for the first time. Jeronimo and Permar held the largest national design competition to date, the first McDonald's Competition, which included over 650 entries (only surpassed in number of entries by the Vietnam Memorial Design Competition).

=== AIAS, Inc. ===
"Dancing Bunnies" Logo, 1985

The growth of the organization began to outweigh the abilities and skills of the national officers alone. In 1982, under the leadership of president William Plimpton (University of California, Berkeley) and Vice president Nora Klebow (Kent State University), the ASC/AIA formally separated from the AIA and incorporated as an independent not-for-profit corporation. To better prepare for the future, a special "Blue Ribbon" Task Force was formed in June 1982 to study the structure and operations of the organization.

In 1984, after a thorough self-examination, president Tom Fowler (New York Institute of Technology-Old Westbury) accepted the recommendations of the Special Task Force to review the structure of the organization. This report further suggested renaming the organization "The American Institute of Architecture Students" (AIAS). The organization hired the first full-time Executive Director, Carl D. Costello. That year, the organization is officially incorporated in Washington, D.C., as The American Institute of Architecture Students, Inc.

1985 president Scott Norberg (University of Nebraska–Lincoln) and vice president Whitney Powers (Mississippi State University) examined issues critical to the architectural scene. During the Kent State Memorial Competition, Ian Taberner's award-winning proposal is rejected by the University "because he was not a citizen of the United States, as required by the design competition". This sparked debate within the AIAS and reached the annual meeting; over 1,100 students attended the 1985 AIAS FORUM in New York.

=== Growth and prosperity ===
The first meeting of AIAS Grassroots Leadership Conference was organized during the summer of 1985. The same year, the AIAS held three national design competitions. In Norberg's second term, alongside vice president Lee W. Waldrep, Ph.D. (Arizona State University), the number of competitions increased to four; the AIAS initiated the Search for Shelter Program to address the growing issue of homelessness in America; and the AIAS contributed to the AIA Education Initiative by establishing the AIAS Outstanding Practitioner in Education award.

In 1988–1989, the AIAS accepted its first chapter outside the United States when the Council of Presidents voted to accept Ryerson Polytechnical Institute in Toronto, Ontario. AIAS further worked on housing for the homeless with active participation in the Habitat for Humanity program. The "Partners in Education" program was also founded; the sponsorship-based program provided individuals and corporations the opportunity to support students of architecture and the AIAS.

In 1989–1990 the AIAS moved into new office space, increased the full-time national office positions to five, and made a major investment in desktop publishing software, which was very expensive at the time. The dues structure for local chapters was also revised to reflect a commitment to the organization by individual member dues, rather that a lump-sum from the entire school. One substantial outgrowth of this revision was the establishment of an active database which allowed individual mailings of pertinent information to each AIAS member. The AIAS initiated also a mandate for the inclusion of a standardized NAAB four-year degree language in college catalogs, adopted by the five collateral architecture organizations the following year.

The 1990–1991 term saw the AIAS experience grow with the addition of thirteen chapters, which pushed membership to a then record 156 chapters. An additional full-time staff person is hired to coordinate AIAS competitions. The year's agenda was largely an affirmation of student commitment to environmental issues. The Environmental Action Committee (EAC) was established to gather information pertaining to environmental issues and their relationship to the design process, and disseminate this information to fellow students and educators. Two significant position papers on architectural education deficiencies and degree nomenclature were also presented to the collateral organizations by AIAS leaders during this term.

The 1991–1992 officers, president Lynn N. Simon (University of Washington) and vice president Kevin P. McGillycuddy (Washington-Alexandria Center), emphasized a devotion to the quality of career counseling and the internship experience. Five national directors focused their endeavors on minority programs, affordable housing, women in architecture, community involvement and career options. The Five Presidents Declaration (five architecture collateral presidents) proposed a single designation for the professional degree in architecture, sparking discussion and debate among students, educators and practitioners.

At the beginning of the 1992–1993 the term, the office produced a new handbook for each chapter to use on the local level, while the 1992–1993 national directors produced informational documents on career options and environmentally safe resources for the studio, as well as a video on women in architecture. A new system of regional coordinators was also set into place, the AIAS Long Range Plan was developed into a finished document, and the Sustainability Declaration was finalized for adoption by the four other collateral organizations.

In 1993–1994, president Garen D. Miller (Drury College) and Vice president Christine A. Malecki (Carnegie Mellon University) hired former AIAS vice president Irene Dumas Tyson as executive director. The Council of Presidents (COP) voted to double individual dues with a goal to maintain a high membership level. The AIAS started to use the internet with involvement on the AIAOnline network and development of an all-electronic design competition. The COP approved a historic policy of the AIAS, requiring all speakers invited to AIAS events to verify that they pay their interns legally-mandated wages. Following the lead of the AIAS, the board of directors of the Association of Collegiate Schools of Architecture (ACSA) and the AIA adopt similar policies.

At the 1995 Grassroots conference, the Council of Presidents was offered three options for membership dues: $12 (the fee at the time), $24 or $36, with the COP voting to triple the dues to $36/school year. This caused a 42% drop in membership to 3,980 members, but 85% of the chapters remained active.

The next year, 1997–1998 president Robert L. Morgan (Clemson University) and vice president Rachel Livingston Ahalt (University of Colorado Denver) focused on the financial viability of the National Office and organized AIAS Legacy members (former officers and directors) to defeat a proposal by the AIA board of directors to investigate the creation of a student category of membership within the AIA. The proposal sparked cohesiveness among AIAS members, and debates at the 1998 AIA Convention reaffirmed AIA members' support for the AIAS as an independent organization.

=== 50th anniversary ===
2002 saw the addition of two days to the Grassroots conference to focus on leadership education in collaboration with professionals from Georgetown University. The AIAS also reached its healthiest financial position at the time with a strong organizational reserve, new investment policies, and professional management. Other organizational changes included a shift in the terms of board of directors to coincide with the Grassroots conference, the creation of Personnel and Finance Committees, the initiation of a strategic planning process and a streamlining of the elections process.

AIAS Logo, 2004

In early 2003, Pam Kortan Day resigned as the executive director and the board of directors hires Michael V. Geary, CAE. Efforts then increased to better market the organization, increase membership, expand fundraising efforts, and prepare for the 50th anniversary. In 2004, the organization adopted a new logo and website. The new logo included an "A" in the middle representing a design compass and the "A"s in the organization's acronym. The masthead and interior of Crit, Journal of the AIAS and AIASinfo (the bimonthly electronic newsletter) are redesigned by Design Army to reflect the modern design aesthetics of the members.

By December 2007, the Great Recession caused significant damage within the construction industry. Many practicing designers in the field of architecture lost their jobs between 2007–2012, and the residual effects caused severe impact on architecture graduates trying to enter the field, with many leaving architecture entirely during 2007–2014. This increased interest in alternative careers in architecture. In 2008, president Andrew C. Caruso (Carnegie Mellon University) and vice president Tony P. Vanky (Tulane University) released the AIAS Issue Brief on Architectural Education. With rapid changes in technology, this anticipatory document highlighted issues relevant to the future education and practice of the profession. The brief was intended to impact the 2008 review of the National Architectural Accrediting Board Conditions for Accreditation, citing opportunities for necessary and visionary change by way of themes such as ecological literacy, social responsibility, global change, urbanism, diversity, technology, and culture.

2009 president JW Blanchard (Southern Polytechnic State University) focused on ensuring the legacy of Crit to continue as a valuable asset to the membership. Development of resources to assist Quads with conference planning were released, which expanded outreach of regional events within the four territories, increasing participation numbers for Quad conferences.

At the end of 2009, Michael V. Geary, CAE resigned as executive director, launching an Executive Search for the organization. Association Strategies was hired to assist in finding a qualified replacement. Joshua Caulfield, IOM was hired in spring of 2010. Strategic planning exercises started in 2006 were carried through to realize long discussed programs, policies, committees, and member benefits to support growing professional needs of the membership. FORUM received a record high attendance of 1,000+ students in Toronto, Ontario, Canada.

Under president Nick Mancusi (Taliesin, The Frank Lloyd Wright School of Architecture) and vice president Laura Meador (Louisiana State University), the AIAS underwent a rebranding effort. Advocacy also shifted forward as a strategic priority of the organization with the introduction of the Federal Student Loans (National Design Services Act). A four-year financial plan to double revenue was created, with the goal to achieve decade record high membership. New program tracks were introduced at the Grassroots Leadership Conference, and membership services were expanded. Gradual recovery from the Great Recession allowed the profession of architecture to recover.

In 2012, the AIAS was met with the resignation of Executive Director Joshua Caulfield, IOM. President Westin Conahan (University of Nevada, Las Vegas) hired Nick Serfass, CAE as the new executive director.

=== 60th anniversary ===
2016 marked the 60th anniversary of the organization. President Sarah Wahlgren (Auburn University) and vice president Rachel Law (Ryerson University) led the celebrations and added an NCARB liaison to the Board of Directors. In 2018, the AIAS hosted its first international conference for students of architecture in the Middle East at the American University in Dubai - president Keshika de Saram (University of Minnesota) and vice president Elizabeth Seidel (University of Montana) attended the event. The following year, president Amelia Rosen (Carnegie Mellon University) created a new strategic plan and established long-term goals for the organization.

The AIAS celebrated 15 years of Freedom By Design at FORUM 2019 in Toronto, Ontario. Executive director Nick Serfass, CAE left the AIAS and was replaced by Karma Israelsen, MA. The AIAS continued to expand overseas, seeing particular growth among students in Latin America and the Middle East. In 2020, new board positions were established for Latin America and the Middle East. President Sarah Curry (Auburn University) published the AIAS' promise to communities of color, the organization published a new document on learning and teaching culture to advocate for healthy learning environments and the board adopts a set of public policies.

The COVID-19 pandemic forced the AIAS to cease all in-person activities at the beginning of 2020. President Erin Conti (Illinois Institute of Technology) and vice president Sara Taketatsu (University of Colorado Boulder) led the board in efforts to adapt programs and events to a virtual environment. Membership numbers and engagement dropped significantly during the pandemic as universities implemented online classes and global lockdowns are put in place. Despite the difficulties, the AIAS successfully hosted its first virtual conference for Grassroots 2020 in July. The year ended with Ashley Ash taking over as interim executive director. A new board liaison position was created for the National Organization of Minority Architects (NOMA), and the AIAS began to promote alternative career paths for graduates of architecture schools. The organization also created a code of ethics and a permanent ethics committee.

2021-2022 officers Scott Cornelius (Oklahoma State University) and Shannon DeFranza (Roger Williams University) continued pandemic recovery efforts for the organization and worked to strengthen relationships with allied organizations. President Cornelius passed a new, short-term strategic plan aimed at stabilizing the organization. All events remained completely virtual through the year, with the exception of one in-person Quad Conference hosted by Georgia Institute of Technology in Atlanta, GA. Larry H. Hoffer was hired as executive director in early 2022.

Grassroots 2022 was held in-person in Washington, D.C. for the first time in three years. Over 450 attendees participated in the event, an all-time high for the organization. A group of organizations that govern the profession of architecture, including the AIAS, came together as the 'alliance organizations' - president Cooper Moore (Kent State University) hosted the leadership of these organizations for the first meeting of the alliance a few months later. Supported by the Board and Staff, President Moore and Vice President Nicole Bass (City College of New York) oversaw an increase in membership numbers for the first time in 7 years.

== Programs ==
=== FORUM ===
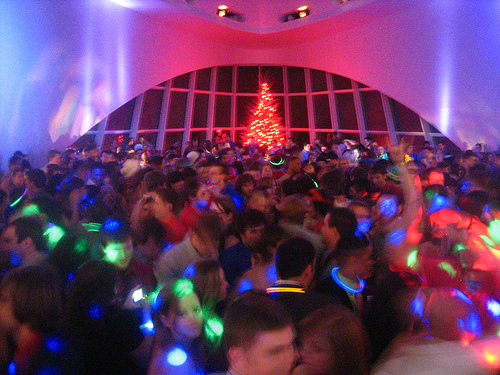
Beaux Arts Ball at the Milwaukee Art Museum, FORUM 2007

FORUM is the annual membership meeting of the AIAS, gathering 600–1,000 architecture students in one city early within the new year. The AIAS signature conference, FORUM, is the largest annual gathering of architecture students in the world.

=== Quad Conferences ===
Organized by the four domestic regions of the AIAS: Northeast, Midwest, South, and West, Quad conferences bring students together at nearby schools of architecture.

=== Freedom by Design ===
Freedom by Design is the community-service portfolio of the AIAS. Students use their design skills to address a wide variety of barriers in their communities.

Initially focused on just physical accessibility, the scope of Freedom by Design was expanded in 2017 to encompass a wider variety of student-driven projects.

A significant amount of support for Freedom by Design is provided by NCARB. NCARB offers both funding and mentorship for participants.

=== CRIT ===
CRIT is the official journal of the American Institute of Architecture Students (AIAS), a student-led organization representing architecture students in the United States and internationally. First published in 1976, the journal focuses on architecture, design, architectural education, research, and related disciplines. It provides a platform for students to publish creative work, research, commentary, and critical perspectives on the built environment and the architectural profession.

=== AIAS Leadership Collective ===
The AIAS Leadership Collective is a six-month leadership development program organized by the American Institute of Architecture Students (AIAS). Established during Grassroots 2026 in commemoration of the organization's 70th anniversary, the program was created to cultivate student leadership and contribute to the organization's strategic development and future direction.

The program selects a cohort of ten student leaders from across the global AIAS community. Participants receive specialized leadership training and collaborate in pairs to oversee designated focus areas within the organization. Throughout the six-month program, participants facilitate working sessions focused on developing and implementing organizational initiatives.

==== First cohort (2026) ====
The inaugural cohort consisted of ten student leaders:

1. Aracely Benegas
2. Ayden Bhagwati
3. Kylie Horne
4. Emmett M. Johnson
5. Drew Kurtenbach
6. Ashley McGuinn
7. Khairi McKinney
8. Kazimierz Predecki
9. McKenzie Rehrer
10. Erick Armando Silva Jr.

== Members and chapters ==
The organization is made up of members from various chapters across the United States and abroad. Currently at 6,000 members, the AIAS represents the nearly 25,000 architecture students enrolled in NAAB accredited programs. Being centralized in the U.S., regions are based on four domestic geographic territories: Northeast Quad, Midwest Quad, South Quad, and West Quad, as well as two additional international regions: the Middle East and Latin American Regions.

Chapters follow the governing rules of the AIAS set forth in the Bylaws and Rules of the Board; however, every chapter also creates their independent culture based on location, design school philosophies, support from faculty and administrators, and engagement of students.

Chapter leaders serve on the Council of Presidents (COP). This governing body of the organization meets twice a year to vote on business of the AIAS, including election of the board of directors. Meetings of the COP occur at the Grassroots Leadership Conference in the summer and FORUM, the annual meeting during New Years break.

== See also ==
- American Institute of Architects
- National Architectural Accrediting Board
- National Council of Architectural Registration Boards
- Society of Architectural Historians (SAH)
