= Bachelor of Architecture =

Professional degree

A Bachelor of Architecture (B.Arch.) is an undergraduate professional degree designed to satisfy the academic requirement of practicing architecture around the world.

== Australia ==
Entry to Australian architecture programs is highly competitive and the proportion of students at some architecture schools from outside Australia is very high, up to 50%.

== Bangladesh ==
In Bangladesh Bachelor of Architecture (B. Arc) is a 5 years professional undergraduate degree.

== China ==
In China, the undergraduate degree programs of Bachelor of Architecture take five years to complete. Only a small groups of universities that passed the architectural assessment from the Academic Degrees Committee of the State Council of China can award Bachelor of Architecture degrees. Other universities can only award Bachelor of Engineering degrees with a major in architecture.

== France ==
In France, architectural education is offered in various independent schools of architecture, both private and public. The first step of architectural education is the Diploma of Studies in Architecture, a three-year non- professional degree. This degree does not allow registration as an architect, awardees must pursue a Master of Architecture in order to obtain vocational qualification.

== India ==
In India, the Council of Architecture regulates the architectural education and maintains a registry of higher education institutions approved to offer a 5-year long Bachelor of Architecture degree. This degree is required for registration as an architect with the Council of Architecture, which also regulates the practice of architecture.

== Ireland ==
Architectural education is available as a five-year long Bachelor of Architecture degree, or as a combination of a three-year or four-year Bachelor of Science in Architecture followed by a Master of Architecture that lasts one to two years.

After completing a degree programme or programmes of study accredited by the Royal Institute of the Architects of Ireland, to become a registered architect a person must gain two years of practical experience working with a registered architect and must pass the Professional Practice Examination, in order to apply.

== Israel ==
Architectural education is offered in five universities, BArch lasts for five years in Israel (apart from the Technion which is split into B.Sc. and M.Arch degrees and lasts for six years). Only universities that pass the architectural assessment from the Council for Higher Education in Israel, can award the BArch degree.

== Turkey ==
Architectural education is offered in various universities as a four-year program. The language of the program depends on the university.

== United Arab Emirates ==
The American University of Sharjah is the first university outside of North America to offer a BArch that is officially accredited by the US-based National Architectural Accrediting Board (NAAB).

== United Kingdom ==
Architectural education differs slightly in the United Kingdom. A five-year course used to exist in a similar fashion to the United States, but the 1960s saw the introduction of the sandwich course and a split of the BArch into a 3-year BA (Hons.) degree (or in some cases BSc) followed by a year working in practice, after which a 2-year MA, PG-DipArch, M.Arch. or BArch is completed. A further year of work completes the student's education upon the passing of Part III final examinations (See below). Registration as an architect is then permissible by the Architects Registration Board. Many UK universities offer postgraduate programs by coursework and research in architecture and related fields such as landscape architecture, planning, and urban design.

=== The RIBA three-part examinations ===
In effect, for most students to become an architect in the United Kingdom they must pass or be exempted from parts I, II and III of the RIBA's examinations. Completion of the three-year BA or BSc gives an exemption from Part I. Completion of the two-year DipArch, M.Arch. or BArch gives exemption from Part II and the final two years of supervised practical training, with supplemental examinations and assignments, makes up the requirements for Part III.

An alternative route to qualification exists by sitting the exams directly - currently this administered by Oxford Brookes University on behalf of the RIBA.

Several universities offering architecture courses are validated by the Royal Institute of British Architects in the UK (some offering only some parts of the three parts required).

Several universities outside of the UK offer architecture courses like ADU validated by the Royal Institute of British Architects at part I and part II level. For students who want to study outside of the UK, the RIBA recognized courses offer the advantage of internationally recognized degrees, and other benefits, such as the possibility of RIBA membership.

== United States ==
The Bachelor of Architecture is accredited by the National Architectural Accrediting Board (NAAB) as a professional degree, allowing the recipient to qualify for the Architect Registration Examination (ARE). NAAB-accredited BArch programs must include at least 150 semester credit hours, or the quarter-hour equivalent, of which at least 45 semester hours, or the quarter-hour equivalent are in general studies, typically requiring five years to complete.

There are also universities that offer a four-year degree such as a Bachelor of Science in Architectural Studies or a Bachelor of Science in architecture (B.S.Arch) or a Bachelor of Arts in Architectural Studies (B.A.Arch). These are non-accredited, pre-professional degrees, and so these students must enroll in a Master of Architecture (M.Arch) program to be professionally licensed. However, enrolling in a pre-professional program may get a student into a shorter M.Arch program. Any architecturally-related curriculum may eventually make licensure possible, depending upon the laws or regulations of the jurisdiction in which the license is required.

The course of study of the Bachelor of Architecture includes studio courses on design and aesthetic theory, as well as practical courses on structures, building mechanical systems, electrical systems, plumbing and construction. Student work is often in the form of drawings and renderings, either through computer-aided design or drafting by hand. Students also build physical models and create presentation boards for drawings and graphics.

In nearly all architecture schools in the United States, student life and work revolves around a studio class. Other classes in the architecture curriculum are designed to support the concepts emphasized in studio. One particularly rigorous aspect of studio classes is the "critique" or "review." Students "pin-up" their models and presentation drawings for instructors (and students) who offer constructive criticism.

Many schools offer an M.Arch as the first professional degree, preceded by a nonprofessional B.A./B.S. in Architecture undergraduate degree.

== See also ==
- Master of Architecture
- List of international architecture schools
- Vocational university
