= Active database =

Database with event driven features

In computing, an active database includes an event-driven architecture (often in the form of ECA rules) that can respond to conditions both inside and outside the database. Possible uses include security monitoring, alerting, statistics gathering and authorization.

Most modern relational databases include active database features in the form of database triggers.
