= Intern Architect Program =

Canadian architecture program

The Intern Architect Program (IAP), or sometimes the Internship in Architecture Program, is a national program in Canada that documents and evaluates internship activities, provides structure to the transition between education and registration, and encourages involvement of practitioners in the development of new architects. The IAP was established by the Committee of Canadian Architectural Councils (CCAC), which is composed of representatives from each of the ten provincial associations of architects.

== See also ==
- Intern architect
