= Committee of Canadian Architectural Councils =

The Committee of Canadian Architectural Councils (CCAC) is an organization in Canada of representatives from each of the ten provincial associations of architects. The CCAC manages the development of national policies and standards for the admission to the profession of architecture in Canada. The CCAC is administered by the Royal Architectural Institute of Canada (RAIC).

The CCAC established the Intern Architect Program (IAP) to standardize internship in Canada.

== See also ==
- Architect
