= E. D. Latta Nurses' Residence =

Historic residential building in North Carolina, US

- U.S. National Register of Historic Places
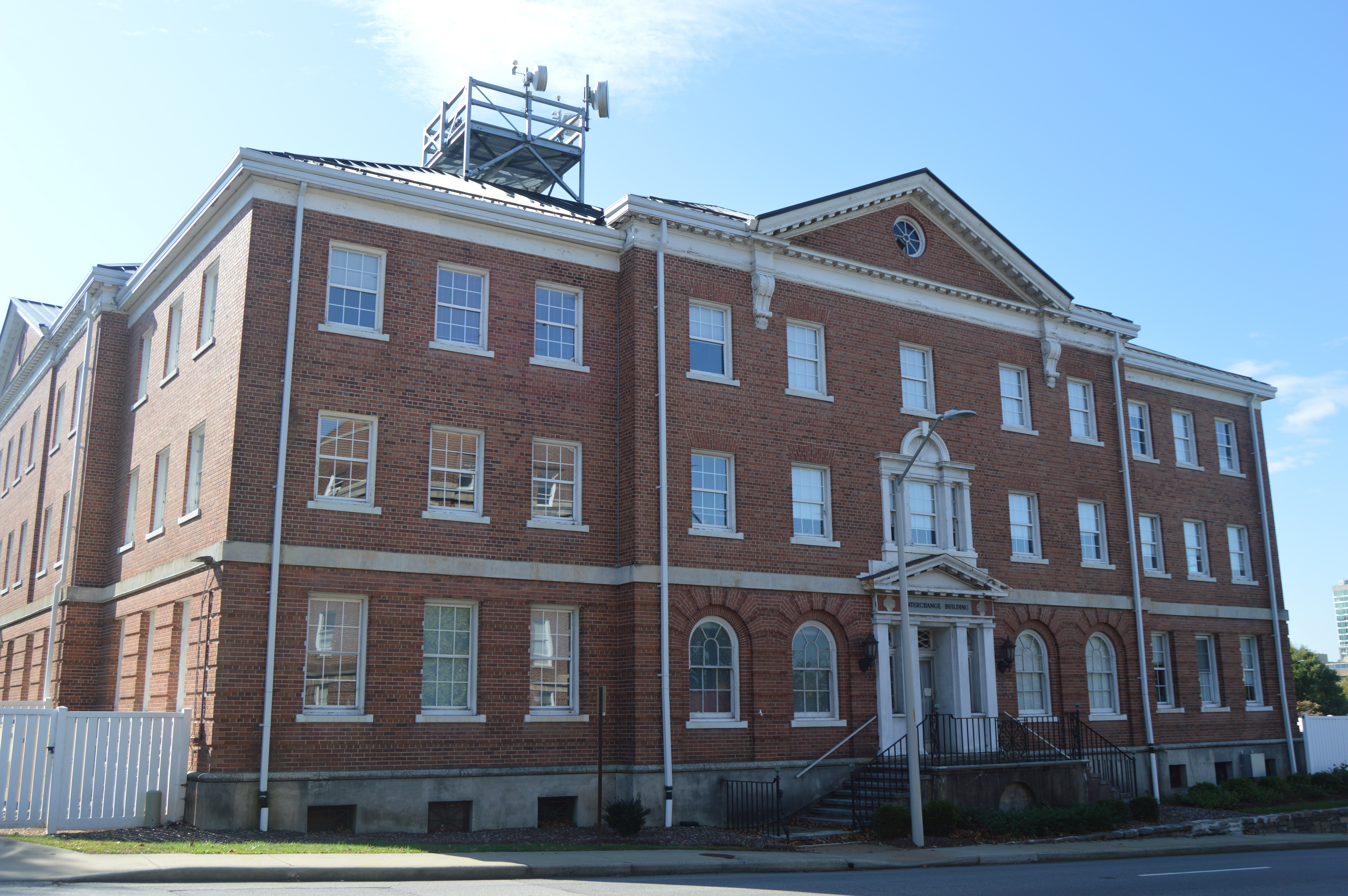
- Facade

- Location within North Carolina Location within the United States
- Location: 159 Woodfin St., Asheville, North Carolina
- Coordinates: 35°35′58″N 82°32′48″W
- Area: less than one acre
- Built: 1929
- Architect: Lord & Lord
- Architectural style: Colonial Revival, Neo-Georgian
- MPS: Asheville Historic and Architectural MRA
- NRHP reference No.: 79001677
- Added to NRHP: April 26, 1979

E. D. Latta Nurses' Residence is a historic residential building located at Asheville, Buncombe County, North Carolina. It was built in 1929, and is a three-story, 11-bay, L-shaped brick building in the Colonial Revival style. The central five bays form a slightly projecting pavilion with pediment. It features a shallow Tuscan order portico at the main entrance.

It was listed on the National Register of Historic Places in 1979.
