= Latta House (Dyersburg, Tennessee) =

Historic house in Tennessee, United States

- U.S. National Register of Historic Places
- Location within Tennessee Location within the United States
- Location: 947 Troy Ave., Dyersburg, Tennessee
- Coordinates: 36°2′31″N 89°23′6″W
- Built: 1852
- Architect: Samuel Rankin Latta
- NRHP reference No.: 78002586
- Added to NRHP: November 14, 1978

Latta House is a historic house in Dyersburg, Tennessee.

== History ==
The house was built in 1852 by Samuel Rankin Latta. Latta was a Pennsylvania native who had moved to Tennessee and worked as a lawyer and teacher. He served as an officer in the Confederate States Army during the Civil War. His Civil War letters to his wife, Mary, are in the Tennessee State Library and Archives. The letters include a first-hand account of the Battle of Shiloh. The house was listed on the National Register of Historic Places in 1978.

== Description ==
The original one story building constituted a three room cottage. There have been single room additions on the northeast and southwest sides of the buildings. The front façade consists of five bays with a porch running the length of the central three bays.
