= National Architectural Accrediting Board =

American accrediting agency

The National Architectural Accrediting Board (NAAB), established in 1940, is the oldest accrediting agency for architectural education in the United States. The NAAB accredits professional degrees in architecture offered by institutions with U.S. regional accreditation. Currently, there are 153 accredited programs offered by 123 institutions. The NAAB develops standards and procedures appropriate for the education of architects. These standards are developed by architectural educators, practitioners, regulators, and students.

The minimum standards that all NAAB-accredited programs must meet are described in The 2014 NAAB Conditions for Accreditation.

The NAAB operates in an open, transparent manner in keeping with best practices in accreditation promulgated by the Association of Specialized and Professional Accreditors and the International Network of Quality Assurance Agencies in Higher Education (INQAAHE). This transparency extends to the process for review of the Conditions for Accreditation, publication of visiting team reports, and requirements for accredited programs to make information available to the public.

The NAAB-accredited degree is accepted for registration in all 54 U.S. jurisdictions and is required in 37 of them. Those seeking registration must also meet local jurisdictional requirements for experience and education.

The NAAB is a signatory to the Canberra Accord. This is a multi-lateral agreement between accreditation agencies that recognizes the substantial equivalence of their systems of accreditation. In addition, all signatory members have demonstrated their compliance with the UNESCO-UIA Charter on Architectural Education, as well, as the INQAAHE Guidelines of Good Practice.

== See also ==
- Architect
- Architecture school in the United States
- Bachelor of Architecture
- Master of Architecture
- Architect Registration Examination
