= National Council of Architectural Registration Boards =

American professional association

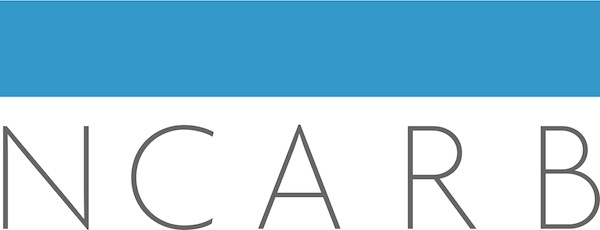
- Type: Non-profit corporation - 501(c)(6)
- Industry: Architecture
- Founded: 1919
- Headquarters: Washington, DC
- Key people: John Patrick Rademacher, President Michael J. Armstrong, CEO
- Website: ncarb.org

The National Council of Architectural Registration Boards (NCARB) is a nonprofit organization comprising the legally constituted architectural registration boards of the 50 states, the District of Columbia, Guam, the Northern Mariana Islands, Puerto Rico, and the U.S. Virgin Islands as its members. Its mission is to collaborate with licensing boards to facilitate the licensure and credentialing of architects to protect the health, safety, and welfare of the public.

NCARB recommends model law, model regulations, and other guidelines for adoption by its member jurisdictions, but each makes its own laws and registration requirements. As a service to its members, NCARB develops, administers, and maintains the Architectural Experience Program (AXP) and the Architect Registration Examination (ARE) as well as facilitates reciprocity between jurisdictions through the NCARB Certificate.

== History ==
Illinois became the first state to enact laws regulating the practice of architecture in 1897. In May 1919, during an American Institute of Architects (AIA) convention in Nashville, TN, 15 architects from 13 states came together to form an organization that would become NCARB. Emil Lorch from Ann Arbor, MI, was elected the organization's first president in May 1920.

As expressed by its founding members, NCARB's stated goals were:

- To facilitate the exchange of information on examining, licensing, and regulating architects
- To foster uniformity in licensing and practice laws
- To facilitate reciprocal licensing
- To discuss the merits of various examining methods as well as the scope and content of licensing examinations
- To strive to improve the general education standards of the architectural profession in the United States

== Organization ==
NCARB is led by a Board of Directors elected by the licensing board members at its Annual Business Meeting each June. It has five officers (president, vice president, second vice president, secretary/treasurer, and the past president) and 10 directors (one from each of the six regions, a member board executive director, a public director, and two at-large directors).

Additionally, a chief executive officer, chief operating officer, and chief innovation and information officer lead the headquarters in Washington, DC. Over 100 people are on staff in Washington, DC.

=== NCARB Regions ===
Today, NCARB comprises the registration boards from the 50 U.S. states, the District of Columbia, and four U.S. territories (Guam, the Northern Mariana Islands, Puerto Rico, and the U.S. Virgin Islands). These boards are organized into six regions:

- New England: Connecticut, Maine, Massachusetts, New Hampshire, Rhode Island, Vermont
- Middle-Atlantic: Delaware, District of Columbia, Maryland, New Jersey, New York, Pennsylvania, Virginia, West Virginia
- Southern: Alabama, Arkansas, Florida, Georgia, Louisiana, Mississippi, North Carolina, Puerto Rico, South Carolina, Tennessee, Texas, the U.S. Virgin Islands
- Mid-Central: Illinois, Indiana, Iowa, Kentucky, Michigan, Minnesota, Missouri, Ohio, Wisconsin
- Central States: Kansas, Montana, Nebraska, North Dakota, Oklahoma, South Dakota, Wyoming
- Western: Alaska, Arizona, California, Colorado, Guam, Hawaii, Idaho, Nevada, New Mexico, the Northern Mariana Islands, Oregon, Utah, Washington

== Services ==
Each U.S. jurisdiction grants individuals an architectural license. To become licensed, there are three essential components required by most jurisdictions: education, experience, and examination. NCARB maintains licensure candidate and architect records as a service to their customers and their member registration boards. Additionally, NCARB develops and administers the programs most often required to complete jurisdictions’ experience and examination requirements. NCARB also facilitates reciprocity between jurisdictions and acts on behalf of its Member Boards when negotiating international agreements.

=== Education ===
Most U.S. jurisdictions require a professional degree from a program that is accredited by the National Architectural Accrediting Board (NAAB). NCARB publishes the NCARB Education Standard as a recommendation to its Member Boards, but requirements often vary between jurisdictions. Those who do not have a degree from a NAAB-accredited program may have their degree evaluated through the NAAB's Education Evaluation Services for Architects (EESA) if they would like to earn an NCARB Certificate. More information on the education requirement can be found in the NCARB Education Guidelines.

=== Architectural Experience Program ===
All U.S. jurisdictions accept completion of NCARB's Architectural Experience Program (AXP) to help satisfy their experience requirements. The AXP is a comprehensive training program that was created to ensure that licensure candidates in the architecture profession gain the knowledge and skills required for the independent practice of architecture.

=== Architect Registration Examination ===
The Architect Registration Examination (ARE) is required by all U.S. jurisdictions and accepted by 11 Canadian provinces to satisfy examination requirements for licensure. It is a computerized exam that assesses candidates for their knowledge, skills, and ability to provide the various services required to practice architecture independently.

=== NCARB Record ===
An NCARB Record is a detailed, verified record of education and training, and is used to establish qualifications for examination, registration, and certification. A licensure candidate must have an NCARB Record to participate in the Architectural Experience Program (AXP), the Architect Registration Examination (ARE), or apply for the NCARB Certificate.

=== NCARB Certificate ===
The NCARB Certificate facilitates reciprocal registration among all 55 NCARB Member Boards and can be used to support an application for registration in other countries, including Australia, Canada, Mexico, New Zealand, and the United Kingdom. Although certification does not qualify a person to practice architecture in a jurisdiction, it does signify that he or she has met the highest professional standards established by the registration boards responsible for protecting the health, safety, and welfare of the public.

The standard requirements for the NCARB Certificate are:

1. A professional degree from a NAAB-accredited or Canadian Architectural Certification Board (CACB)-accredited program. If educated in a foreign country, one must have their foreign education evaluated by the National Architectural Accrediting Board through the Education Evaluation Service for Architects (EESA).
2. Complete the Architectural Experience Program (AXP).
3. Pass all divisions of the Architect Registration Examination (ARE).
4. Hold a license to practice from one of the U.S. registration boards.

There are two alternative ways to earn an NCARB Certificate: the Education Alternative and the Foreign Architect Path to Certification. Earning an NCARB Certificate through one of these alternatives is not accepted by all jurisdictions. Architects interested in earning the NCARB Certificate through one of these programs should verify acceptance with the jurisdiction in which they wish to be licensed prior to pursuing certification.

=== Education Alternatives ===
Architects who do not hold a professional architecture degree from a NAAB-accredited architecture program are eligible to apply for an NCARB Certificate through the Education Alternative. The alternative includes two pathways: the Two Times AXP option and the NCARB Certificate Portfolio option.

To be eligible for the Two Times AXP option, applicants must:

- Have at least three years of continuous licensure for the last three consecutive years in any U.S. jurisdiction without disciplinary action.
- Hold a bachelor’s degree that includes significant coursework in architecture (as determined by NCARB).
  - The program must be from an institution with U.S. regional accreditation (or the Canadian equivalent) that is awarded after earning less than 150 semester credits or the quarter-hour equivalent.
  - The program must include 60 semester credit hours (90 quarter hours) of coursework in the degree program major.
  - NCARB does not have a list of accepted degrees, since the amount of architecturally defined content may vary from institution to institution.

Approved applicants then document two times the required hours of the Architectural Experience Program (AXP).

To be eligible for the NCARB Certificate Portfolio option, applicants must have at least three years of continuous licensure for the last three consecutive years in any U.S. jurisdiction without disciplinary action, and any education other than a four-year degree, with significant coursework in architecture. Applicants then create an online portfolio documenting past work experience to satisfy areas of the NCARB Education Standard.

=== Foreign Architect Path to Certification ===
Foreign architects who are registered and in good standing in a country outside of the United States or Canada can seek NCARB certification through the Foreign Architect Path to Certification. The program has the following eligibility requirements:

International Credential/License Requirement

- Your non-U.S. license must be active and in good standing at the point of application.
- Your non-U.S. license must allow unlimited practice—the design of all types and sizes of buildings.
- Your country must have a system for tracking disciplinary action for architects.
- You must have no record of disciplinary action.

Required Education

You must hold a recognized education credential (completed academic degree) in an architecture program that leads to a license/credential for the unlimited practice of architecture in the non-U.S. country. An official transcript of your educational record must be sent directly to NCARB from the school.

Once a candidate has met the requirements, they can use NCARB’s Licensing Requirements Tool to confirm that the U.S. jurisdiction where they want to earn a license accepts the Foreign Architect Path, establish an NCARB Record, and begin submitting supporting documents to establish their eligibility for an NCARB Certificate through the Foreign Architect Path.

After these requirements have been documented, NCARB evaluates the applicant's record and issues a Certificate.

=== Continuing Education ===
NCARB assists architects in keeping their skills and knowledge up-to-date through an expertly developed collection of self-study resources. The objective of NCARB's Continuum Education program is to provide a quality continuing education resource, both economical and convenient, that investigates current and emerging topics of interest to practicing architects. The series explores everything from sustainable design to fire safety in buildings to professional conduct to post-occupancy evaluation. All learning units are American Institute of Architects (AIA) Learning Units, and most qualify as Health, Safety, and Welfare (HSW) units.

=== International Practice ===
NCARB has established reciprocal registration for architects in the United States, Australia, Canada, Mexico, New Zealand, and the United Kingdom and is engaged in similar discussions with additional countries. NCARB also administers the Asia-Pacific Economic Cooperation Architects program in the United States.

== Presidents ==
The following individuals have served as presidents of NCARB. Many, though not all, have been Fellows of the American Institute of Architects.

- Emil Lorch FAIA 1920-1922
- Arthur Peabody FAIA 1923-1924
- Miller I. Kast FAIA 1925-1926
- William H. Lord FAIA 1927-1928
- George D. Mason FAIA 1929
- Clarence W. Brazer AIA 1930-1931
- James M. White FAIA 1932-1933
- Albert L. Brockway FAIA 1933
- Abram M. Edelman AIA 1934
- Joseph W. Holman AIA 1935-1936
- Charles Butler FAIA 1938-1938
- William L. Perkins AIA 1939-1940
- Mellen C. Greeley FAIA 1941-1942
- Louis John Gill FAIA 1943-1944
- Solis Seiferth FAIA 1945-1947
- Warren D. Miller FAIA 1948-1949
- Clinton H. Cowgill FAIA 1950
- Roger C. Kirchhoff AIA 1951-1952
- Charles E. Firestone FAIA 1953-1954
- Fred L. Markham FAIA 1954-1956
- Edgar H. Berners FAIA 1957-1958
- Walter F. Martens FAIA 1959-1960
- A. Reinhold Melander FAIA 1961-1962
- Chandler C. Cohagen FAIA 1963
- Paul W. Drake FAIA 1964
- Ralph O. Mott FAIA 1965
- Clarence J. Paderewski FAIA 1966
- Earl L. Mathes AIA 1967
- George F. Schatz FAIA 1968
- Howard T. Blanchard FAIA 1969
- Dean L. Gustavson FAIA 1970
- William J. Geddis FAIA 1971
- Daniel Boone FAIA 1972
- Thomas J. Sedgewick FAIA 1973
- E. G. Hamilton FAIA 1974
- John O'Brien Jr. AIA 1975
- William C. Muchow FAIA 1976
- Charles A. Blondheim Jr. FAIA 1977
- Paul H. Graven FAIA 1978
- Lorenzo D. Williams FAIA 1979
- John R. Ross FAIA 1980
- Dwight M. Bonham FAIA 1981
- Thomas H. Flesher Jr. AIA 1982
- Sid Frier FAIA 1983
- Ballard H. T. Kirk FAIA 1984
- Robert E. Oringdulph FAIA 1985
- Theodore L. Mularz FAIA 1986
- Robert L. Tessier FAIA 1987
- Walter Carry FAIA 1988
- George B. Terrien AIA 1989
- Herbert P. McKim FAIA 1990
- Charles E. Garrison FAIA 1991
- Robert H. Burke Jr. AIA 1992
- Harry G. Robinson III FAIA 1993
- Robert A. Fielden FAIA 1994
- Homer L. Williams FAIA 1995
- Richard W. Quinn FAIA 1996
- Darrell L. Smith FAIA 1997
- Ann R. Chaintreuil FAIA 1998
- Susan May Allen FAIA 1999
- Joseph P. Giattina Jr. FAIA 2000
- Peter Steffian FAIA 2001
- C. William Bevins FAIA 2002
- C. Robert Campbell FAIA 2003
- Robert A. Boynton FAIA 2004
- Frank M. Guillot FAIA 2005
- H. Carleton Godsey FAIA 2006
- Robert E. Luke FAIA 2007
- Douglas K. Engebretson FAIA 2008
- Gordon E. Mills FAIA 2009
- Andrew W. Prescott AIA 2010
- Kenneth J. Naylor FAIA 2011
- Scott C. Veazey AIA 2012
- Ron Blitch FAIA 2013
- Blakely C. Dunn FAIA 2014
- Dale McKinney FAIA 2015
- Dennis S. Ward FAIA 2016
- Kristine Annexstad Harding FAIA 2017
- Gregory L. Erny FAIA 2018
- David L. Hoffman FAIA 2019
- Terry Allers FAIA 2020
- Robert Calvani FAIA 2021
- Alfred Vidaurri Jr. FAIA 2022
- Bayliss Ward AIA 2023
- Jon Baker FAIA 2024
- Kenneth R. Van Tine AIA 2025

== See also ==
- Registered Architect
- Intern Development Program
- National Architectural Accrediting Board
- American Institute of Architects
- American Institute of Architecture Students
- Architect Registration Examination
