= Architect Registration Examination =

Professional licensure examination in the US

The Architect Registration Examination (ARE) is the professional licensure examination adopted by the 50 states of the United States, the District of Columbia, and four U.S. territories (Guam, the Northern Mariana Islands, Puerto Rico, and the U.S. Virgin Islands). The exam is also accepted by 11 provincial and territorial architectural associations for architectural registration in Canada. The ARE assesses candidates on the knowledge, skills, and abilities required for providing services in the practice of architecture.

The ARE is developed and maintained by the National Council of Architectural Registration Boards (NCARB). The current version of the exam, ARE 5.0, features six divisions that are organized around the progression of a typical architecture project and current practice and are aligned to the experience areas of the Architectural Experience Program (AXP).

== History ==
The earliest examinations were written and scored by each individual state board. Practicing architects, educators, and specialists in other disciplines were organized to prepare and score these tests. Since each state prepared its own test specifications, test questions, and passing standard, there was little uniformity among the boards on examination, no effective reciprocity system, and no equal protection for the public across the nation.

As NCARB grew, it organized delegates from its Member Boards into working groups during its Annual Meetings to address the problem of exam uniformity. Their efforts eventually led to agreement on a syllabus of written examination subjects. Subsequently, the length of each test and the dates of administration were agreed on, and this concurrence served to achieve the goal of greater consistency in examination questions and scoring.

By the late 1950s, standardized testing had made impressive progress. The NCARB examination committees studied the latest developments and converted sections of the syllabus to a multiple-choice format by the mid-1960s and made them available to all of NCARB Member Boards.

In 1979, NCARB conducted an extensive "task analysis and validation study" that led to the development of the forerunner of today's ARE. At that time, candidates were required to take all nine divisions over a four-day period and the exam was only offered once a year in major cities across the United States.

In the late 1980s, as the practice of architecture moved into the computer age, NCARB began to develop a computer-based exam. After a decade of research and development, the last paper-and-pencil test was issued in 1996, and the computer-based exam rolled out in 1997.

NCARB conducted comprehensive Practice Analysis studies in 2001, 2007, and 2012 that led to improvements of the ARE. These improvements have since been rolled out in ARE 3.0, ARE 3.1, ARE 4.0, and ARE 5.0, which launched November 1, 2016. ARE 4.0 retired on June 30, 2018.

== Eligibility ==
Before an ARE division can be scheduled, candidates must be approved to test and receive eligibility from their state board. Each jurisdiction sets its own rules regarding when a candidate is eligible to take the ARE—in most cases, this is after a candidate meets the board’s education requirement. The majority of states participate in NCARB's eligibility services, which enable NCARB to manage a candidate’s eligibilities. Once a candidate has been made eligible to test, they can begin scheduling exam appointments

== Process ==
Candidates can take each of the ARE’s six divisions in person or online through NCARB’s delivery partner, PSI. Divisions are scored by PSI as either pass or fail and then sent to the jurisdiction that grants the candidate the authorization to test, which then notifies the candidate.

Passed ARE divisions are valid throughout the delivery of the version of the exam under which they were taken and are used to establish appropriate credits under the next version of the exam. Once a candidate has passed all divisions of the ARE, they are considered ARE complete, and their division scores are no longer subject to the score validity policy. This score validity policy was established in May 2023 following the retirement of the rolling clock policy, which placed a five-year expiration date on passed exam divisions.

== Test structure ==
NCARB currently offers one version of the exam: ARE 5.0.

=== ARE 3.0 ===
The ARE 3.0 was introduced in February 1996 and its use was discontinued on February 26, 2006. It utilized a similar structure to 4.0. Graphic vignettes and multiple choice questions were on separate tests.

=== ARE 3.1 ===
The ARE 3.1 was introduced on February 27, 2006. Use was discontinued in 2009.

- Pre-Design (105 MC questions)
- General Structures (85 MC questions)
- Lateral Forces (75 MC questions)
- Mechanical and Electrical Systems (105 MC questions)
- Building Design/Materials and Methods (105 MC questions)
- Construction Documents & Services (115 MC questions)
- Site Planning (Site zoning, site Grading, and Site Design vignettes)
- Building Planning (Interior layout and schematic design vignettes)
- Building Technology (Building section, structural layout, accessibility/ramp, mechanical and electrical plan, stair design and roof plan vignettes)

=== ARE 4.0 ===
The ARE 4.0 was introduced in July 2008, was available through June 30, 2018, and consisted of seven divisions:

- Programming, Planning & Practice (85 multiple choice and fill-in questions, and one site zoning vignette)
- Site Planning & Design (65 multiple choice and fill-in questions, and two vignettes: site grading and site planning)
- Building Design & Construction Systems (85 multiple choice and fill-in questions, and three vignettes in accessibility, roof plan and stair design)
- Schematic Design (two vignettes in building layout and interior layout)
- Structural Systems (125 multiple choice and fill-in questions, and one structural layout vignette)
- Building Systems (95 multiple choice and fill-in questions, and one mechanical & electrical plan vignette)
- Construction Documentation & Services (100 multiple choice and fill-in questions, and one building section vignette)

=== ARE 5.0 ===
ARE 5.0 was introduced in November 2016 and consists of six divisions. These divisions include multiple-choice questions, check-all-that-apply, hotspot, drag-and-place, and case study questions. On February 27, 2024 NCARB removed quantitative-fill-in-the-blank (QFIB) item types.

- Practice Management (65 items)
- Project Management (75 items)
- Programming & Analysis (75 items)
- Project Planning & Design (100 items)
- Project Development & Documentation (100 items)
- Construction & Evaluation (75 items)

== Exam confidentiality ==
All NCARB tests are held in strict security and confidence and are protected by U.S. copyright laws. Before beginning the test, candidates are required to read, understand, and accept the ARE Candidate Agreement, which prohibits any disclosure of exam content.

Candidates found to have violated the ARE Candidate Agreement are referred to NCARB's Committee on Professional Conduct. The Committee reviews each case and then recommends a disciplinary action. The cases are then forwarded to the NCARB Board of Directors for review and, if applicable, a final disciplinary action.

== See also ==
- Examination for Architects in Canada
- Architectural Experience Program (AXP)
- National Council of Architectural Registration Boards (NCARB)
