= Expresso =

Expresso may refer to:

- Espresso, a coffee beverage
- eXpresso, a hosted workspace for Microsoft Office communities
- Expresso (Donkey Kong), a character in the Donkey Kong Country series
- Expresso (newspaper), based in Lisbon, Portugal
- Expresso (film), a 2007 English comedy short
- Espresso (song), a 2024 single by Sabrina Carpenter
- Plymouth Expresso, a 1994 compact concept car
- Sud Expresso, or Sud Express, an international train between Lisbon and the Spanish/French border at Hendaye
- Expresso Bongo, a 1958 West End musical
- Expresso Bongo (film), a 1959 film based on the stage musical
- Expresso Telecom, African telecommunications services company, active in Mauritania, Senegal and Sudan.
- "Expresso", a season 2 episode from Servant (TV series)

== See also ==
- Expresso II, an album by Pierre Moerlen's Gong
- Espresso (disambiguation)
- Express (disambiguation)
