= Expression =

Expression may refer to:

== Linguistics ==
- Expression (linguistics), a word, phrase, or sentence
- Fixed expression, a form of words with a specific meaning
- Idiom, a type of fixed expression
- Metaphorical expression, a particular word, phrase, or form of words that has a different meaning than its literal form
- Expression (sign language), the expressions and postures of the face and body that contribute to the formation of words when signing

== Symbolic expression ==
- Expression (architecture), implies a clear and authentic displaying of the character or personality of an individual person
- Expression (mathematics), a symbolic description of a mathematical object
- Expression (computer science), an instruction to execute something that will return a value
- Regular expression, a means of matching strings of text in computing
- Expression marks, in music, notating the musical dynamics
- Symbolic computation expression
- S-expression

== Bodily expression ==
- Expression of breast milk in breastfeeding
- Emotional expression, verbal and non-verbal behaviour that communicates emotion
- Facial expression, a movement of the face that conveys emotional state
- Gene expression, the process by which information from a gene is used in biochemistry
- The manual expression of pimples, also known as "pimple popping"

== Product names ==
- Expression (album), a 1967 album by John Coltrane
- Expressions (Chick Corea album), a 1994 album by Chick Corea
- Expressions (Sarah Geronimo album), 2013
- Expressions, an album by Jon Secada
- "Expression" (song), a song by Salt-n-Pepa
- Expressions, the annual magazine of Vidyalankar Institute of Technology, Mumbai, India
- Microsoft Expression Studio, a digital media and graphic design suite
- Ex'pression College for Digital Arts, a college in Emeryville, California for the entertainment industry
- The Expression (album)

== Other ==
- Musical expression
- Method of obtaining (vegetable) οil by pressure extraction, such as Expeller pressing
- Self-expression values

== See also ==
- Express (disambiguation)
- Expressivity (disambiguation)
