= Richard Beaudoin (composer) =

American composer of contemporary music

Richard Beaudoin (born October 10, 1975) is an American composer of contemporary music. His music and writings explore compositional uses of expressive timing, or microtiming.

== Life ==
Beaudoin was born in North Attleborough, Massachusetts. He graduated from North Attleborough High School in 1993, studied privately with bassist Mibbit Threats, and enrolled at Amherst College in 1993 where he remained for three years, studying with Lewis Spratlan.

In 1996, he withdrew from Amherst College and spent a year living in Mortlake, near London, studying composition privately with Michael Finnissy. He returned to Amherst College and graduated summa cum laude in 1998. He was a MacDowell Colony Fellow in January 1999.

In 2000, Beaudoin returned to London and earned his M.Mus. in Music Composition from London's Royal Academy of Music in 2002, studying again with Michael Finnissy. He returned to the United States and, in 2008, earned his Ph.D. in Composition and Music Theory from Brandeis University, studying composition with David Rakowski and Martin Boykan, and theory with Eric Chafe.

While still a Ph.D. student at Brandeis, he held two visiting professorships at Amherst College: as Joseph A. and Grace W. Valentine Visiting Professor of Music at Amherst College (2005–06) and as Visiting Professor of Music (2007). Since earning his Ph.D., he has taught composition and theory at Harvard University, first as lecturer on Music (2008–11) and then as Preceptor in Music (2011–present).

== Music ==
Beaudoin's most widely performed works are those related to expressive timing, or microtiming. This process, which he developed in 2009 with the Swiss musicologist Olivier Senn, is based on millisecond-level microtemporal analyses of recorded performances. The timing measurements of every sound in a given recording are used to create a detailed transcription of the recording in musical notation, often in elongation.

Beaudoin has composed cycles of works based on microtimings of specific recordings. The twelve works in the series Études d'un prélude (2009–2010) are based on Martha Argerich's October 1975 recording of Chopin's E minor Prélude, Op. 28, no. 4. The six works in the series The Artist and his Model (2010–2012) are based on Alfred Cortot's July 1931 recording of Debussy's Prélude, "...La file aux cheveux de lin". Other source works have included Maurizio Pollini performing Anton Webern (nach Webern, nach Pollini 2011), Thelonious Monk improvising on "Body and Soul" (Now anything can hang at any angle 2011), and Pablo Casals performing Johann Sebastian Bach (Ebenbild 2014).

In addition to the music based on microtiming, Beaudoin has written over 50 songs, including a cycle of 17 songs called Nach-Fragen (The Inquiries), for the German soprano Annette Dasch, commissioned by the Konzerthaus Dortmund. He has also composed chamber operas for Boston Lyric Opera and Staatstheater Kassel.

Writings on these works, by Beaudoin and others, have appeared in the Journal of Music Theory, Perspectives of New Music, Divergence Press, The Journal of Aesthetics and Art Criticism, and David Bard-Schwarz's 2014 book, An Introduction to Electronic Art Through the Teaching of Jacques Lacan: Strangest Thing. Beaudoin has lectured widely on his music, including at the Centre for Music and Science at Cambridge University, the Royal Academy of Music in London, and at the Hochschule, Luzern in Switzerland.

Recordings include Microtimings (New Focus Recordings, 2012), a double album by Mark Knoop and the Kreutzer Quartet, and Constantine Finehouse's Backwards Glance Piano Music by Brahms and Beaudoin (Spicerack Records, 2010). A collection of six scores was published in the handmade artist book Richard Beaudoin: The Artist and his Model (Daniel Kelm, 2014).

== Works (partial list) ==
Year	Type	Title
1999	Orchestra/Large ensemble	Two Women
2000	Orchestra/Large ensemble	Arcangelo
2001	Orchestra/Large ensemble	I Hear America Singing
2001	Orchestra/Large ensemble	Three Dreams
2001	Choral	A stand of people, a cappella choir
2002	Songs	Light Verse, voice and piano
2004	Solo	Qui Tollis
2005	Chamber	In höchster Not, for violin and piano, dedicated to Jesse Holstein
2005	Chamber	Love Affairs and Tales of Atrocity
2005	Solo	Five Counterpoints
2005	Solo	La bella confusione
2005	Songs	Eunoia Songs, tenor and piano
2006	Solo	Étude: The world itself might be vague
2006	Solo	Les signes de ma faiblesse
2007	Chamber	Memor fui nocte nominis tui—First String Quartet
2007	Opera	Pierre
2007	Songs	Romanzero Lieder, tenor and piano
2008	Solo	Summer Canons
2008	Opera	Himmelfahrt (Ascension), chamber opera for six voices
2008	Songs	Nach-Fragen, voice and piano
2009	Orchestra/Large ensemble	Étude d'un prélude V—Photorealism
2009	Chamber	Étude d'un prélude II—Flutter Echoes
2009	Chamber	Étude d'un prélude VI—The Real Thing
2009	Chamber	Étude d'un prélude VII—Kertész Distortion
2009	Chamber	Étude d'un prélude X—Second String Quartet
2009	Solo	Étude d'un prélude XI—four28
2009	Solo	Étude d'un prélude VII—Latticed Window
2009	Solo	Étude d'un prélude IV—Black Wires
2009	Solo	Étude d'un prélude I—Chopin desséché
2009	Songs	Étude d'un prélude III—Wehmut
2010	Chamber	The Artist and his Model II—La durée sans contacts s'affaiblit, string quartet
2010	Solo	The Artist and his Model I—La fille floutée
2010	Solo	nach Webern, nach Pollini
2010	Opera	The After-Image (Das Nach-Bild), bass, mezzo-soprano, clarinet, violin, violoncello and piano
2010	Songs	dreifacher Frühling
2011	Chamber	The Artist and his Model IV—La tradition française
2011	Solo	Now anything can hang at any angle
2011	Solo	The Artist and his Model III—La fille rhythmée
2011	Opera	The After-Image (Das Nach-Bild)
2011	Choral	Villanelle for an Anniversary
2012	Chamber	The Artist and his Model VI—La fille dérivée
2012	Solo	The Artist and his Model V—Brûlage
2012	Songs	Three Darsham Songs
2014	Orchestra/Large ensemble	Ebenbild
2014	Chamber	Ladies and Gentlemen
