= Architect =

Person who designs buildings and oversees construction

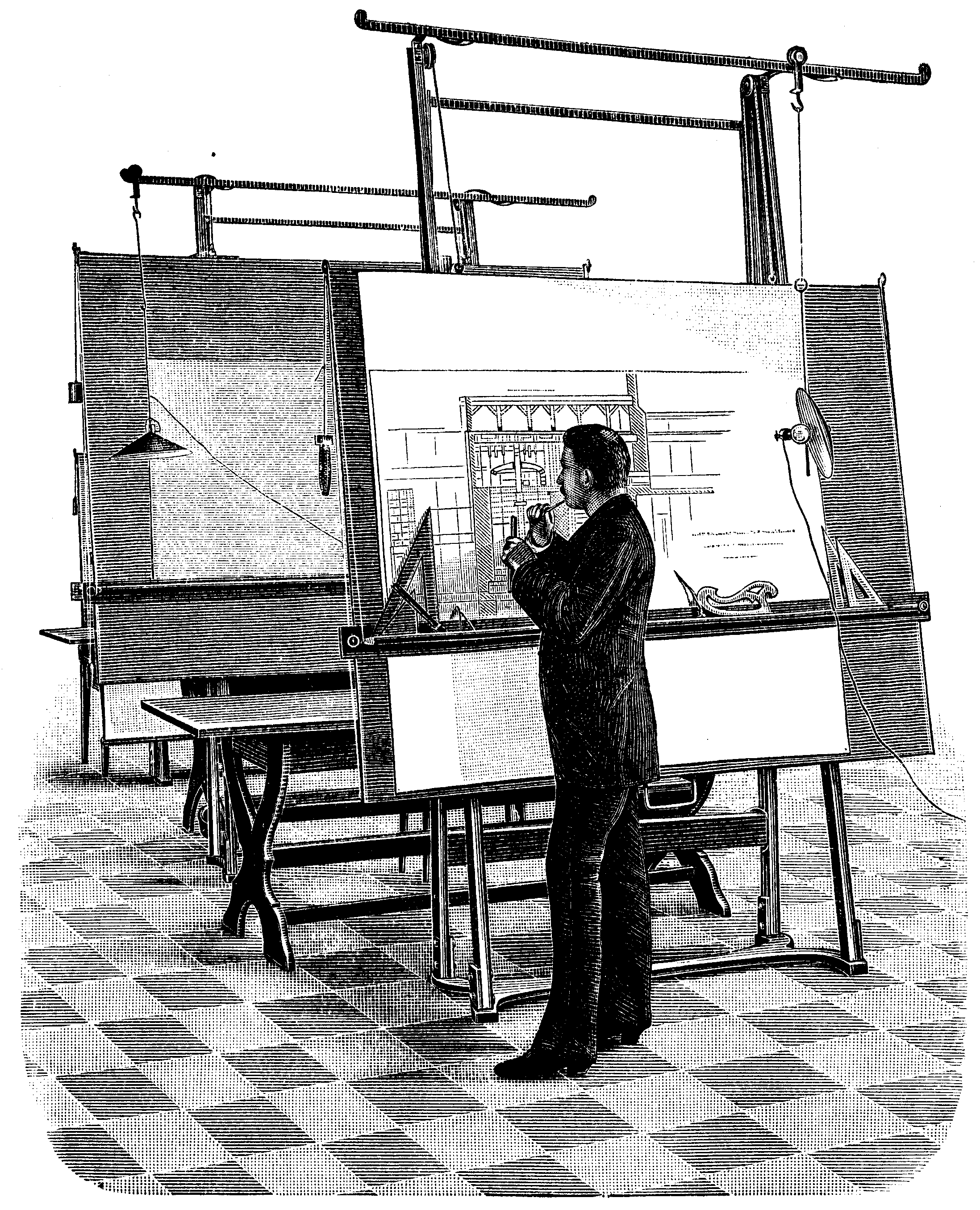
- An architect, 1893

Occupation
- Names: Architect
- Occupation type: Profession
- Activity sectors: Architecture; Civil engineering Structural engineering Construction; Project management Urban planning Interior design Visual arts

Description
- Competencies: Engineering, technical knowledge, building design, planning and management skills
- Education required: See professional requirements

An architect is a person who plans, designs, and oversees the construction of buildings. To practice architecture means to provide services in connection with the design of buildings and the space within the site surrounding the buildings that have human occupancy or use as their principal purpose. Etymologically, the term architect derives from the Latin architectus, which derives from the Greek (arkhi-, chief + tekton, builder), i.e., chief builder.

The professional requirements for architects vary from location to location. An architect's decisions affect public safety, and thus the architect must undergo specialised training consisting of advanced education and a practicum (or internship) for practical experience to earn a license to practice architecture. Practical, technical, and academic requirements for becoming an architect vary by jurisdiction though the formal study of architecture in academic institutions has played a pivotal role in the development of the profession.

== Origins ==
Throughout ancient and medieval history, most architectural design and construction was carried out by artisans—such as stone masons and carpenters—who rose to the role of master builders. Until modern times, there was no clear distinction between architect and engineer. In Europe, the titles architect and engineer were primarily geographical variations that referred to the same person, often used interchangeably. "Architect" derives from Greek ἀρχιτέκτων (arkhitéktōn, "master builder", "chief tektōn").

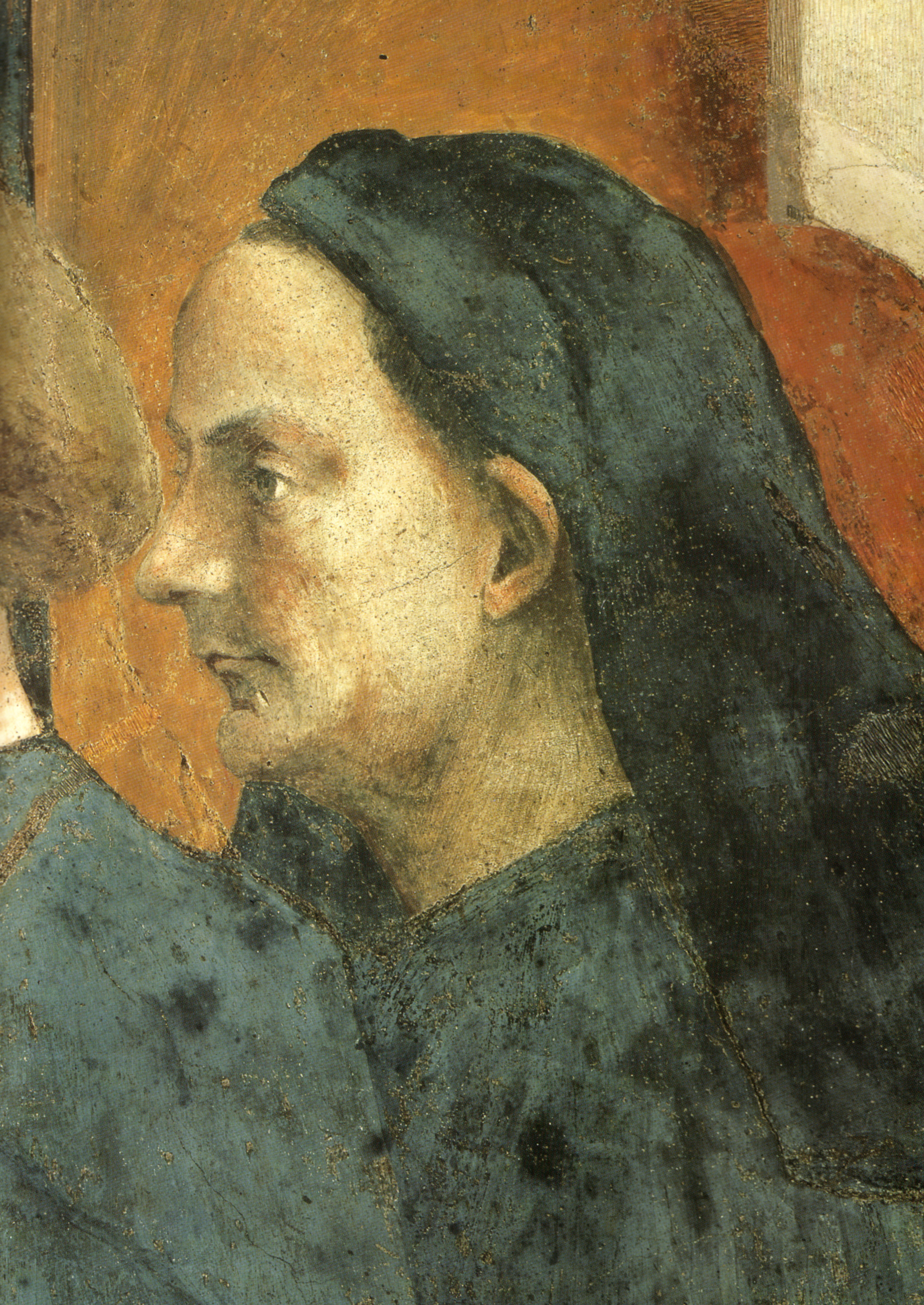
Filippo Brunelleschi is revered as one of the most inventive and gifted architects in history.

It is suggested that various developments in technology and mathematics allowed the development of the professional 'gentleman' architect, separate from the hands-on craftsman. Paper was not used in Europe for drawing until the 15th century but became increasingly available after 1500. Pencils were used for drawing by 1600. The availability of both paper and pencils allowed pre-construction drawings to be made by professionals. Concurrently, the introduction of linear perspective and innovations such as the use of different projections to describe a three-dimensional building in two dimensions, together with an increased understanding of dimensional accuracy, helped building designers communicate their ideas. However, development was gradual and slow-going. Until the 18th century, buildings continued to be designed and set out by craftsmen, with the exception of high-status projects.

== Architecture ==
In most developed countries only those qualified with an appropriate license, certification, or registration with a relevant body (often a government) may legally practice architecture. Such licensure usually requires a university degree, successful completion of exams, and a training period. Laws regarding the representation of oneself as an architect through the use of terms and titles varies by jurisdiction, though is usually restricted to licensed individuals. Some jurisdictions like the US state of California also restrict the use of derivative terms such as associate architect or architectural designer, while elsewhere these are acceptable titles for those engaged in the practice of architecture but who are not yet licensed.

To practice architecture implies the ability to practice independently of supervision. The term building design professional (or design professional), by contrast, is a much broader term that includes professionals who practice independently under an alternate profession, such as engineering professionals, or those who assist in the practice of architecture under the supervision of a licensed architect, such as intern architects. In many places, independent, non-licensed individuals may perform design services outside of professional restrictions, such as the design of houses or other smaller structures.

== Practice ==
In the architectural profession, technical and environmental knowledge, design, and construction management require an understanding of business as well as design. However, design is the driving force throughout the project and beyond. An architect accepts a commission from a client. The commission might involve preparing feasibility reports, building audits, and designing a building or several buildings, structures, and the spaces among them. The architect participates in developing the requirements the client wants in the building. Throughout the project (planning to occupancy), the architect coordinates a design team. Structural, mechanical, and electrical engineers are hired by the client or architect, who must ensure that the work is coordinated to construct the design.

=== Design role ===
The architect, once hired by a client, is responsible for creating a design concept that meets the requirements of that client and provides a facility suitable for the required use. The architect must meet with and ask questions to the client, to ascertain all the requirements (and nuances) of the planned project.

Often, the full brief is not clear in the beginning. It involves a degree of risk in the design undertaking. The architect may make early proposals to the client, which may rework the terms of the brief. The "program" (or brief) is essential to producing a project that meets all the needs of the owner. This becomes a guide for the architect in creating the design concept.

Design proposals are generally expected to be both imaginative and pragmatic. Much depends upon the time, place, finance, culture, and available crafts and technology in which the design takes place. The extent and nature of these expectations will vary. Foresight is a prerequisite when designing buildings, as it is a very complex and demanding undertaking.

Any design concept during the early stage of its generation must take into account a great number of issues and variables, including the qualities of the space(s), the end-use and life-cycle of these proposed spaces, connections, relations, and aspects between spaces, including how they are put together, and the impact of proposals on the immediate and wider locality. The selection of appropriate materials and technology must be considered, tested, and reviewed at an early stage in the design to ensure there are no setbacks (such as higher-than-expected costs) that could occur later in the project.

The site and its surrounding environment, as well as the culture and history of the place, will also influence the design. The design must also balance increasing concerns with environmental sustainability. The architect may introduce (intentionally or not), aspects of mathematics and architecture, new or current architectural theory, or references to architectural history.

A key part of the design is that the architect often must consult with engineers, surveyors, and other specialists throughout the design, ensuring that aspects such as structural supports and air conditioning elements are coordinated. The control and planning of construction costs are also part of these consultations. Coordination of the different aspects involves a high degree of specialized communication, including advanced computer technology such as building information modeling (BIM), computer-aided design (CAD), and cloud-based technologies. Finally, at all times, the architect must report back to the client, who may have reservations or recommendations that might introduce further variables into the design.

Architects also deal with local and federal jurisdictions regarding regulations and building codes. The architect might need to comply with local planning and zoning laws such as required setbacks, height limitations, parking requirements, transparency requirements (windows), and land use. Some jurisdictions require adherence to design and historic preservation guidelines. Health and safety risks form a vital part of the current design, and in some jurisdictions, design reports and records are required to include ongoing considerations of materials and contaminants, waste management and recycling, traffic control, and fire safety.

==== Means of design ====
Previously, architects employed drawings to illustrate and generate design proposals. While conceptual sketches are still widely used by architects, computer technology has now become the industry standard. Furthermore, design may include the use of photos, collages, prints, linocuts, 3D scanning technology, and other media in design production. Increasingly, computer software is shaping how architects work. BIM technology allows for the creation of a virtual building that serves as an information database for the sharing of design and building information throughout the life cycle of the building's design, construction, and maintenance. Virtual reality (VR) presentations are becoming more common for visualizing structural designs and interior spaces from the point-of-view perspective.

=== Environmental role ===
Since modern buildings are known to release carbon into the atmosphere, increasing controls are being placed on buildings and associated technology to reduce emissions, increase energy efficiency, and make use of renewable energy sources. Renewable energy sources may be designed into the proposed building by local or national renewable energy providers. As a result, the architect is required to remain abreast of current regulations that are continually being updated. Some new developments exhibit extremely low energy use or passive solar building design. However, the architect is also increasingly being required to provide initiatives in a wider environmental sense. Examples of this include making provisions for low-energy transport, natural daylighting instead of artificial lighting, natural ventilation instead of air conditioning, pollution, and waste management, use of recycled materials, and employment of materials which can be easily recycled.

=== Construction role ===
As the design becomes more advanced and detailed, specifications and detail designs are made of all the elements and components of the building. Techniques in the production of a building are continually advancing which places a demand on the architect to ensure that he or she remains up to date with these advances.

Depending on the client's needs and the jurisdiction's requirements, the spectrum of the architect's services during each construction stage may be extensive (detailed document preparation and construction review) or less involved (such as allowing a contractor to exercise considerable design–build functions).

Architects typically put projects to tender on behalf of their clients, advise them on the award of the project to a general contractor, facilitate and administer a contract of agreement, which is often between the client and the contractor. This contract is legally binding and covers a wide range of aspects, including the insurance and commitments of all stakeholders, the status of the design documents, provisions for the architect's access, and procedures for the control of the works as they proceed. Depending on the type of contract used, provisions for further sub-contract tenders may be required. The architect may require that some elements be covered by a warranty which specifies the expected life and other aspects of the material, product, or work.

In most jurisdictions prior notification to the relevant authority must be given before commencement of the project, giving the local authority notice to carry out independent inspections. The architect will then review and inspect the progress of the work in coordination with the local authority.

The architect will typically review contractor shop drawings and other submittals, prepare and issue site instructions, and provide Certificates for Payment to the contractor (see also Design-bid-build) which is based on the work done as well as any materials and other goods purchased or hired in the future. In the United Kingdom and other countries, a quantity surveyor is often part of the team to provide cost consulting. With large, complex projects, an independent construction manager is sometimes hired to assist in the design and management of the construction.

In many jurisdictions mandatory certification or assurance of the completed work or part of the work is required. This demand for certification entails a high degree of risk; therefore, regular inspections of the work as it progresses on site is required to ensure that the design is in compliance itself as well as following all relevant statutes and permissions.

=== Alternate practice and specialisations ===
Recent decades have seen the rise of specialisations within the profession. Many architects and architectural firms focus on certain project types (e.g. healthcare, retail, public housing, and event management), technological expertise, or project delivery methods. Some architects specialise in building code, building envelope, sustainable design, technical writing, historic preservation (US) or conservation (UK), and accessibility.

Many architects elect to move into real-estate (property) development, corporate facilities planning, project management, construction management, chief sustainability officers interior design, city planning, user experience design, and design research.

== Professional requirements ==
Although there are variations in each location, most of the world's architects are required to register with the appropriate jurisdiction. Architects are typically required to meet three common requirements: education, experience, and examination.

Basic educational requirements generally consist of a university degree in architecture. The experience requirement for degree candidates is usually satisfied by a practicum or internship (most often two to three years). Finally, a Registration Examination or a series of exams is required prior to licensure.

Professionals who engaged in the design and supervision of construction projects before the late 19th century were not necessarily trained in a separate architecture program in an academic setting. Instead, they often trained under established architects. Prior to modern times, there was no distinction between architects and engineers and the title used varied depending on geographical location. They often carried the title of master builder or surveyor after serving a number of years as an apprentice (such as Sir Christopher Wren). The formal study of architecture in academic institutions played a pivotal role in the development of the profession as a whole, serving as a focal point for advances in architectural technology and theory. The use of "Architect" or abbreviations such as "Ar." as a title attached to a person's name was regulated by law in some countries.

== Fees ==
Architects' fee structure is typically based on a percentage of construction value, as a rate per unit area of the proposed construction, hourly rates, or a fixed lump sum fee. Combination of these structures is also common. Fixed fees are usually based on a project's allocated construction cost and could range between 4 and 12% of new construction cost for commercial and institutional projects, depending on the project's size and complexity. Residential projects range from 12 to 20%. Renovation projects typically command higher percentages such as 15–20%.

Overall billings for architectural firms range widely, depending on their location and economic climate. Billings have traditionally been dependent on local economic conditions, but with rapid globalization, this is becoming less of a factor for large international firms. Salaries could also vary depending on experience, position within the firm (i.e. staff architect, partner, or shareholder, etc.), and the size and location of the firm.

== Professional organizations ==
A number of national professional organizations exist to promote career and business development in architecture.

- The International Union of Architects (UIA)
- The American Institute of Architects (AIA) US
- Royal Institute of British Architects (RIBA) UK
- Architects Registration Board (ARB) UK
- The Australian Institute of Architects (AIA) Australia
- The South African Institute of Architects (SAIA) South Africa
- Association of Consultant Architects (ACA) UK
- Association of Licensed Architects (ALA) US
- The Consejo Profesional de Arquitectura y Urbanismo (CPAU) Argentina
- Indian Institute of Architects (IIA) & Council of Architecture (COA) India
- The Jamaican Institute of Architects (JIA)
- The National Organization of Minority Architects (NOMA) US

== Prizes and awards ==
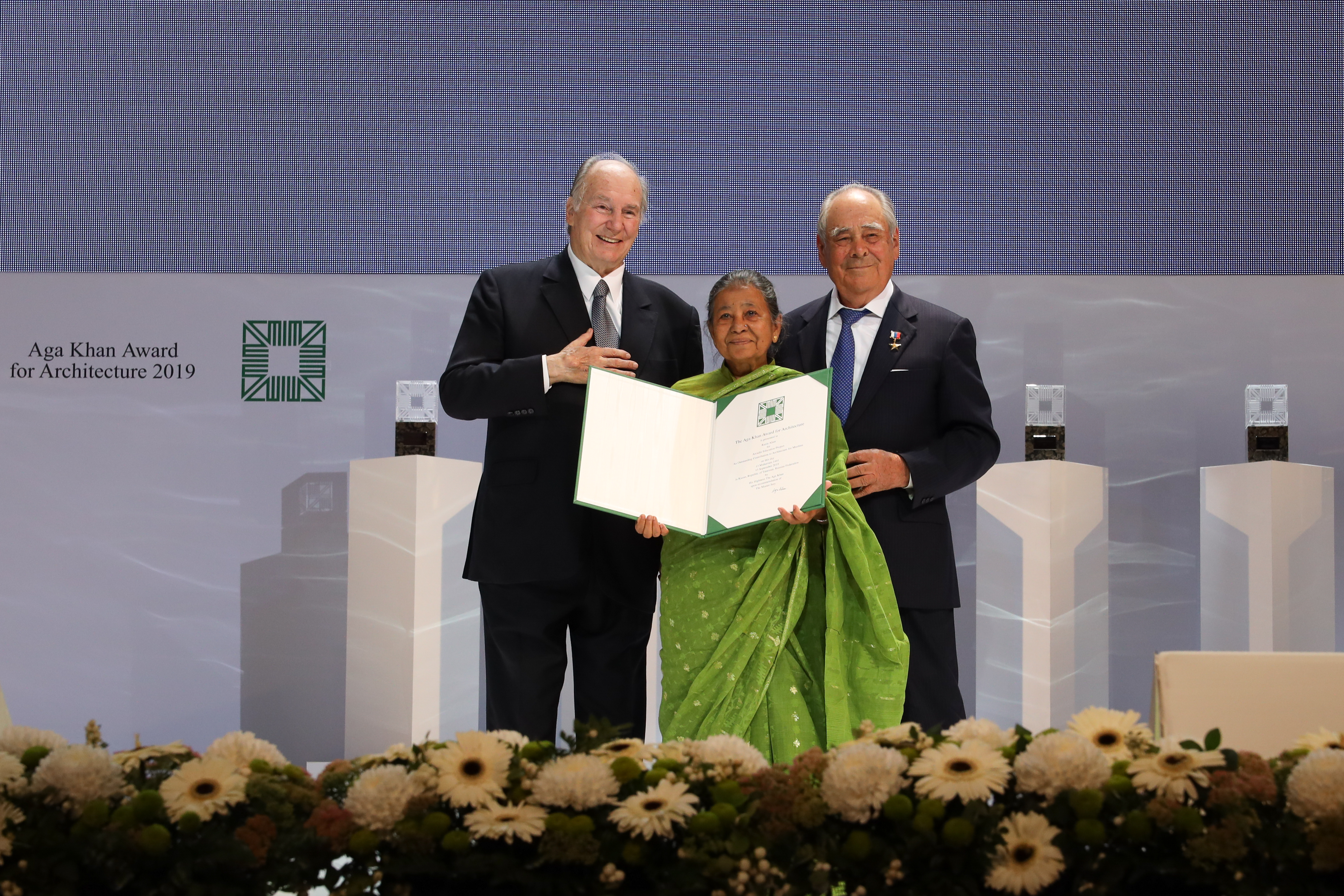
Ceremony for the 2019 Aga Khan Award for Architecture, presenting the award for the Arcadia Education Centre

A wide variety of prizes is awarded by national professional associations and other bodies, recognizing accomplished architects, their buildings, structures, and professional careers.

The most lucrative award an architect can receive is the Pritzker Prize, sometimes termed the "Nobel Prize for architecture". The inaugural Pritzker Prize winner was Philip Johnson who was cited as having "50 years of imagination and vitality embodied in a myriad of museums, theatres libraries, houses gardens and corporate structures". The Pritzker Prize has been awarded for forty-two straight editions without interruption, and there are now 22 countries with at least one winning architect. Other prestigious architectural awards are the Royal Gold Medal, the AIA Gold Medal (US), AIA Gold Medal (Australia), and the Praemium Imperiale.

Architects in the UK who have made contributions to the profession through design excellence or architectural education or have in some other way advanced the profession might, until 1971, be elected Fellows of the Royal Institute of British Architects and can write FRIBA after their name if they feel so inclined. Those elected to chartered membership of the RIBA after 1971 may use the initials RIBA but cannot use the old ARIBA and FRIBA. An honorary fellow may use the initials Hon. FRIBA, and an international fellow may use the initials Int. FRIBA. Architects in the US who have made contributions to the profession through design excellence or architectural education or have in some other way advanced the profession are elected Fellows of the American Institute of Architects and can write FAIA after their name. Architects in Canada who have made outstanding contributions to the profession through contributions to research, scholarship, public service, or professional standing to the good of architecture in Canada or elsewhere may be recognized as Fellows of the Royal Architectural Institute of Canada and can write FRAIC after their name. In Hong Kong, those elected to chartered membership may use the initial HKIA, and those who have made a special contribution after nomination and election by the Hong Kong Institute of Architects (HKIA), may be elected as fellow members of HKIA and may use FHKIA after their name.

== See also ==
- Architectural designer
- Architectural drawing
- Architectural engineering
- Architectural technologist
- Building officials
- Chartered architect
- Civil engineer
- Construction engineering
- Construction manager
- Drafter
- Expression (architecture)
- Industrial architecture
- Landscape architect
- List of architects
- List of construction occupations
- Starchitect
- State architect
- Structural engineering
- Urban designer
- Urban planner
- Women in architecture
