= Evening Express =

Evening Express may refer to:

- Evening Express (Scotland), a local newspaper serving the city of Aberdeen in Scotland
- Evening Express (Portland), a defunct daily newspaper in Portland, Maine, US
- Evening Express, a program on HLN
- New York Evening Express, a defunct 19th century newspaper in New York City
- Evening Express (1849 to 1902), then the Evening Express and Evening Mail (1902–1917), defunct newspaper published in Cardiff

== See also ==
- Liverpool Evening Express
- Express (disambiguation)
