= Espresso (disambiguation) =

Espresso is a coffee beverage.

Espresso may also refer to:

- Espresso (microprocessor), used in the Wii U game console
- Espresso, the development name for the T-Mobile myTouch 3G Slide
- Espresso Book Machine, a printing press
- Espresso heuristic logic minimizer, circuit design software
- L'Espresso, an Italian magazine
- Quantum ESPRESSO, a chemistry software suite
- ESPRESSO, a spectrographic instrument of the Very Large Telescope array in northern Chile

== Songs ==
- "Espresso" (song), a 2024 song by Sabrina Carpenter
- "Espresso", a song by Twice from the album Formula of Love: O+T=<3

== See also ==
- Suzuki S-Presso, a city car
- Express (disambiguation)
- Expresso (disambiguation)
