= Express =

Express, The Expresss or EXPRESS may refer to:

== Arts, entertainment and media ==
=== Film ===
- Express: Aisle to Glory, a 1998 comedy short film featuring Kal Penn
- The Express: The Ernie Davis Story, a 2008 film starring Dennis Quaid
- The Express (2022 film), a Russian tragicomedy film

=== Music ===
- Express (album), by Love and Rockets, 1986
- "Express" (B. T. Express song), 1975
- "Express" (Christina Aguilera song), 2010
- "Express" (Dina Carroll song), a song by Dina Carroll from the 1993 album So Close

=== Periodicals ===
- Daily Express, a British newspaper
- Daily Express (Urdu newspaper), in Pakistan
- Express, a defunct financial newspaper in Greece
- Express, a city supplement published by The New Indian Express newspaper
- L'Express, a French magazine
- The Express (Adelaide), later The Express and Telegraph, a former evening newspaper in South Australia
- Express (Cologne newspaper), a daily tabloid in Germany
- The Express (Granville newspaper), a former community newspaper in New South Wales
- The Express (Illinois newspaper), a weekly in Tallula, Menard County, U.S.
- Express (Washington, D.C., newspaper), a defunct daily
- Express News (TV channel), in Pakistan
- Gazeta Express, a newspaper in Pristina, Kosovo
- Los Angeles Express (newspaper), a daily in Los Angeles
- The Shepherd Express, an alternative weekly in Wisconsin

== Businesses and organizations ==
- American Express, an American multinational financial services corporation
- Express, Inc., an American specialty fashion retailer
- Express Media, an Australian youth arts organisation
- Express Media Group (Pakistan), a media group in Pakistan
- Express Werke, a German bicycle and motorcycle manufacturer

== Science and technology ==
- Ekspress ('Express'), a series of Russian communications satellites
- EXPRESS (data modeling language)
- Express.js, a web framework written for Node.js
- ExpressCard, a new interface standard for notebook external cards, replacing PCMCIA
- ExPRESS Logistics Carrier, an International Space Station payloads program
- Outlook Express, a Microsoft email and news client
- EXPRES, an optical fiber spectrograph and telescope instrument

== Transportation ==
- C&C 110 Express, an American sailboat design
- ExpressJet, an American airline
- Express bus service, a fast bus service, usually with a limited number of stops
- Express train, a fast train service, usually with a limited number of stops
- Chevrolet Express, a full-size van
- Honda Express, a moped
- Renault Express, a van
- SS Express, several ships
- Talbot Express, a van
- Volvo Express, high roof estate version of the Volvo Duett
- York Factory Express, or "the Express", a 19th-century Hudson's Bay Company transport route
- Wheeler Express, an airplane

== Sports ==
- Air21 Express, a Philippine basketball team now called Barako Bull Energy
- Chicago Express, an ECHL hockey team from 2011–12
- Los Angeles Express (USFL), a team in the United States Football League
- Memphis Express, a team in the Alliance of American Football
- Ra'anana Express, an Israeli baseball team
- Round Rock Express, a Class AAA baseball team in Round Rock, Texas, U.S.
- Express FC, Ugandan association football club

== Other uses ==
- Express (weaponry), a category of high-velocity rifles and ammunition
- Express mail, a postal delivery service
- Gene expression, the process by which information from a gene is used in the synthesis of a functional gene product

== See also ==
- Ekspress (disambiguation)
- Espresso, a coffee beverage
- Expression (disambiguation)
- Expressway (road)
- Expressway (disambiguation)
- L'Express (disambiguation)
- Xpress (disambiguation)
