= Timing (music) =

Timing in music refers to the ability to "keep time" accurately and to synchronise to an ensemble, as well as to expressive timing—subtle adjustment of note or beat duration, or of tempo, for aesthetic effect.

Research in music cognition has shown that time as a subjective structuring of events in music, differs from the concept of time in physics. Listeners to music do not perceive rhythm on a continuous scale, but recognise rhythmic categories that function as a reference relative to which the deviations in timing can be appreciated. Temporal patterns in music combine two different time scales—rhythmic durations such as half and quarter notes on the one hand, and on the other, the continuous timing variations that characterize an expressive musical performance.

== See also ==
- Rhythm
- Time signature
