= Wind controller =

Electronic wind instrument

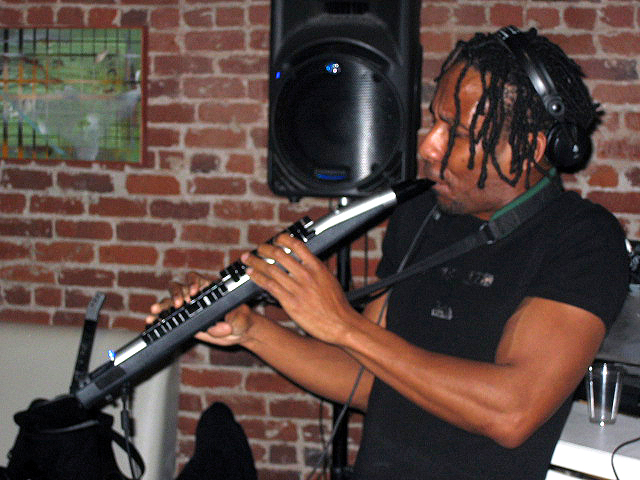
San Francisco musician Onyx Ashanti playing a wind controller

A wind controller, sometimes referred to as a wind synthesizer, is an electronic wind instrument. It is usually a MIDI controller associated with one or more music synthesizers. Wind controllers are most commonly played and fingered like a woodwind instrument, usually the saxophone, with the next most common being brass fingering, particularly the trumpet. Models have been produced that play and finger like other acoustic instruments such as the recorder or the tin whistle. The most common form of wind controller uses electronic sensors to convert fingering, breath pressure, bite pressure, finger pressure, and other gesture or action information into control signals that affect musical sounds. The control signals or MIDI messages generated by the wind controller are used to control internal or external devices such as analog synthesizers or MIDI-compatible synthesizers, synth modules, softsynths, sequencers, or even non-instruments such as lighting systems.

Simpler breath controllers are also available. Unlike wind controllers, they do not trigger notes and are intended for use in conjunction with a keyboard or synthesizer. A breath controller can be used with a keyboard MIDI controller to add articulation and expression to notes sounded on the keyboard. For example, a performer who has pressed a long-held note on the keyboard with a sustained sound, such as a string pad, could blow harder into the breath controller set to control volume to make this note crescendo or gradually blow more and more gently to make the volume die away.

Some wind controllers contain a built-in sound generator and can be connected directly to an amplifier or a set of headphones. Some even include small built-in speakers such as the Roland Aerophone series and the Akai EWI SOLO, however their small speaker systems cannot reproduce bass notes correctly or provide adequate sound levels for serious live performance, so these built in sound systems are strictly for home practice at modest playback levels. Some wind controllers such as EWI USB, Berglund NuEVI, and NuRAD are strictly "controllers" and do not make a sound on their own, and thus must be connected via MIDI or USB to a sound generating device (or a soft synth). For this reason, a wind controller can sound like almost anything (depending on the capabilities of its sound generator). Wind controller models such as the Akai Professional EWI5000, EWI SOLO, and Roland Aerophones have built-in onboard sample sounds, as well as the MIDI and/or USB outputs. The now discontinued EWI 4000s had a DSP subtractive synthesizer built in rather than sampled instruments and so remains popular on the second hand market.

The fingering and shape of the wind controller put no acoustic limitations on how the wind controller actually sounds. For example, a wind controller can be made to sound like a trumpet, saxophone, violin, piano, pipe organ, choir, synthesizers or even a barnyard rooster. Whether designed primarily to appeal to woodwind, brass, or harmonica players, controllers can produce any virtual instrument sound. Some virtual instruments and hardware synthesizers are better suited to adaption for wind controller performance than others. A hardware or software synthesizer's suitability is largely dependent on the control options available. MIDI CC mapping options allow the player to control elements like the filter cut off via breath control for expressive dynamics. Custom patches (or presets) are required for optimal expressivity, to take advantage of the considerable benefits of wind control.

== History ==
=== Predecessors ===
Already in the 1930s Benjamin F. Miessner was working on various electroacoustic instruments. Among these was an electroacoustic clarinet, that featured an electromagnetic pickup for the reed vibration and was connected to a variety of electronic filters. Miessner's patent from 1938 marks the birth of the electronic wind instrument family.

Early experiments with fully electronic instruments started in the 1940s. Leo F. J. Arnold invented an electronic clarinet that featured an on/off-switch controlled by the human breath. This instrument is documented in Arnold's patent from 1942.

The Frenchman Georges Jenny and the German engineer Ernst Zacharias played an essential role in the development of the first analog wind controllers in the 1950s. Jenny received his patent for an electronic wind instrument in 1954. It features a breath transducer for variable volume control, that works with a piezo element. The prototypes of Zacharias, who started to work on electronic wind instruments in 1956, lead to the first commercially produced wind synthesizer – the Hohner Electra-Melodica, released in 1967.

=== Analog wind controllers ===
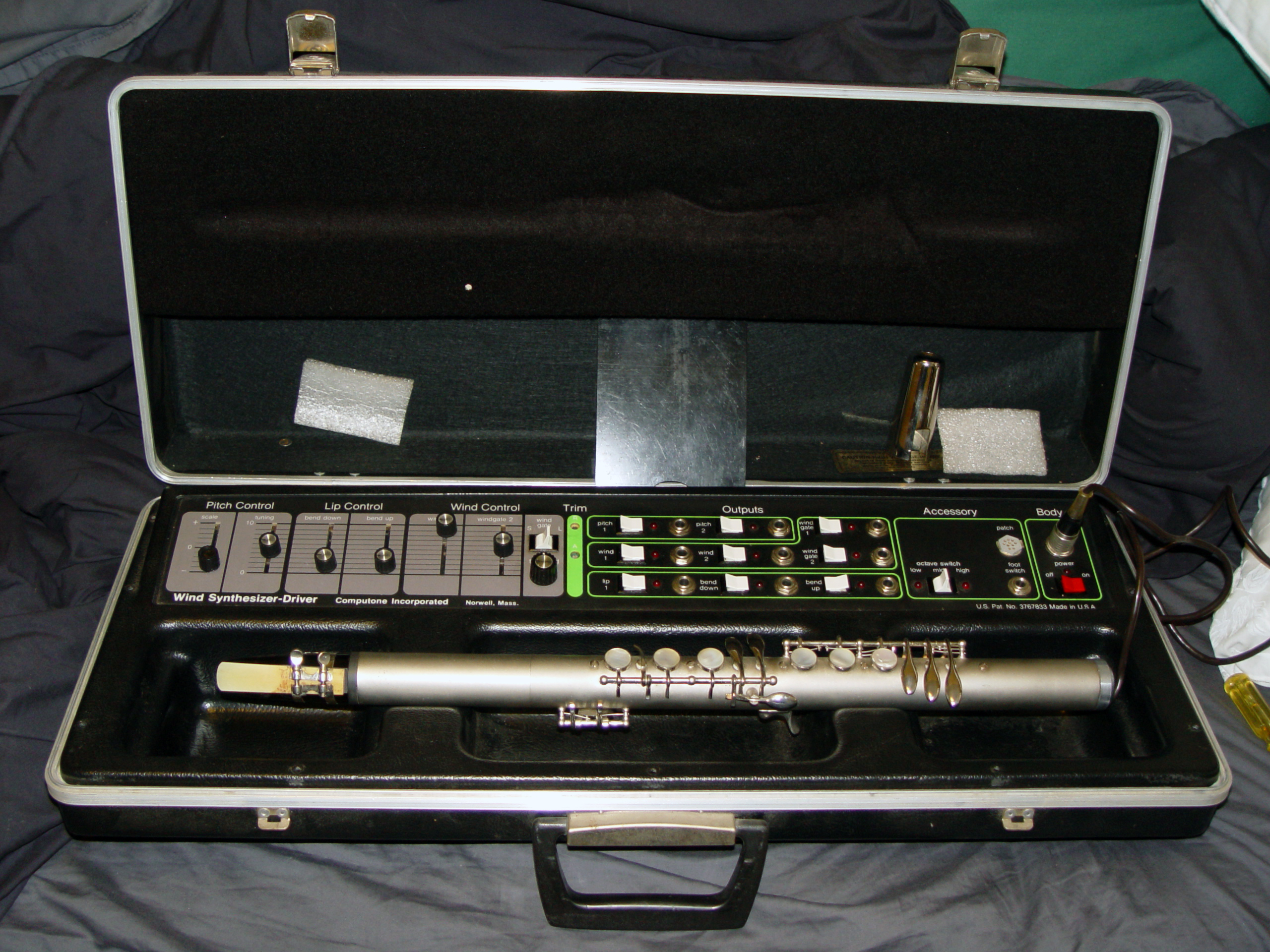
Computone Wind Synthesizer Controller (essentially, Lyricon II without synthesizer)

The first widely played wind controller was the Lyricon from Computone which came about in the 1970s era of analog synthesizers. The Lyricon was based on the fingerings of the saxophone and used a similar mouthpiece. It set the standard for hardware-based wind controllers with a number of features that have been preserved in today's MIDI wind controllers, including the ability to correctly interpret the expressive use of reed articulation, breath-controlled dynamics, and embouchure-controlled pitch variation. The Lyricon also expanded the playing range several octaves beyond the accustomed range for woodwind players. Tone generation on the Lyricon was limited to a dedicated analog synthesizer designed specifically to interpret various wired analog outputs from the instrument. Notable early recording artists on the Lyricon include Roland Kirk and Tom Scott. Third-party adaptations would later bring the Lyricon into the MIDI era.

The next wind controller of note was the brass style Steiner EVI invented by wind controller pioneer Nyle Steiner. Steiner was the inventor of the brass style EVI (electronic valve instrument) wind controller designed for brass players, as well as the EWI (electronic woodwind instrument) designed for woodwind players. Steiner made many very important contributions to the development wind controllers. His research started in the late 1960s and his first wind controller was the Steiner Parker EVI released in 1975. Originally this EVI was only a "controller" which sent control voltages only for pitch and gate and was to be connected to commercial analog synthesizers. The breath sensor on this early original model EVI was very crude consisting of a simple on/off switch activated by the player's breath pressure. Steiner went on to refine and develop new expressive methods of sensing the player's gestures which have since become standard wind controller features such as an expressive proportional type breath sensor (as compared to earlier switch on/off type breath sensing), tonguing velocity sensing, a vibrato lever for the right hand thumb, pitch bend up and down thumb sensors, glide sensing for portamento effects, bite sensing, lip sensing, and others. Steiner's analog wind controller systems eventually included his own analog synthesizer design bundled into a complete self-contained system (Steinerphone). Steiner was also a studio musician and he played his EVI on the soundtrack of the film "Apocalypse Now". Shortly after the release of the Steiner EVI, woodwind musicians asked Steiner to make a woodwind version of the EVI, and Steiner designed the EWI. The EWI was made famous in the mid 1980s by jazz musician Michael Brecker with the group Steps Ahead when he played the Steinerphone EWI with dazzling bravura. Around 1985 Steiner developed a sophisticated MIDI interface for his EVI and EWI by modifying the JL Cooper Wind Driver box. In 1987, Akai licensed Steiner's EVI and EWI designs and released the Akai EVI1000 brass style and woodwind style EWI1000 wind controllers along with a companion EWV2000 sound module. The EWV2000 featured a MIDI output jack which allowed it to connect to additional MIDI synthesizers opening up a universe of possibilities and numerous recordings in both movie and television soundtracks as well as pop music recordings. The EVI1000 or EWI1000 controllers combined with the EWV2000 sound generator were actually a hybrid digital/analog system. Analog signals were derived from the various sensors (e.g., key, bite, bend, glide, etc.) on the EVI1000/EWI1000 controller unit, then converted to digital signals by a front-end microprocessor in the EWV2000. These digital signals were then altered by the microprocessor and D/A converted to internal analog control voltages appropriate for the analog synthesizer ICs within the EWV2000. The D/A used within the EWV2000 used a very high resolution and conversion rate, such that the responsiveness to the player felt immediate, i.e. "analog". The subsequent EWI3000, EWI3020, and EWI3030m systems also used this A/D/A scheme within their dedicated tone modules, though these later models of the EWI would support MIDI in and out.

=== MIDI controller revolution ===
With the advent of MIDI and computer-based digital samplers in the early 1980s, the new music technology ushered in a variety of "alternative" MIDI controllers. In the 1960s and 1970s, the main way for a musician to play synthesizers was with a keyboard. With MIDI, it became possible for non-keyboardists to play MIDI synthesizers and samplers for the first time. These new controllers included, most notably: MIDI drums, MIDI guitar synthesizers, and MIDI wind controllers. Leading the way to demonstrate the virtuosic potential of this new arsenal of MIDI technology on the world stage through extensive touring and big-label recordings were guitarist Pat Metheny playing the guitar synthesizer and saxophonist Michael Brecker playing the wind controller, each leading their own bands.

=== Digital wind controllers and MIDI ===
The most widely played purely digital wind controllers include the Yamaha WX series and the Akai EWI series. These instruments are capable of generating a standard MIDI data stream, thereby eliminating the need for dedicated synthesizers and opening up the possibility of controlling any MIDI-compatible synthesizer or other device. These instruments, while usually shaped something like a clarinet with a saxophone-like key layout, offer the option to recognize fingerings for an assortment of woodwinds and brass. The major distinction between the approach taken by the two companies is in the action of their keys. Yamaha WX series instruments have moving keys like a saxophone or flute that actuate small switches when pressed. Akai EWI series instruments have immovable, touch-sensitive keys that signal when the player is merely making contact with the keys. In the hands of skilled players each of these instruments has proved its ability to perform at a high level of artistry.

The now defunct Casio DH series were toy-like wind controllers introduced in the mid-1980s and had a built-in speaker (with limited sound sources) as well as being usable as MIDI controllers.

A recent addition to the wind controller category is the Synthophone, an entirely electronic wind controller embedded in the shell of an alto saxophone. Since the electronic components take up the open space of the saxophone, it is not playable as an acoustic instrument; however, since the exterior matches that of the acoustic instrument, it is significantly more familiar to play.

Additionally, keyboard-based breath controllers are also available. These modulate standard keyboards, computers and other midi devices, meaning they are not played like a woodwind, but like a keyboard, but with a breath controller (similar to a pump organ.) Yamaha's BC series can be used to control DX and EX units. Midi Solutions makes a converter box that allows any midi device to be controlled by the Yamaha BC controllers. TEControl also makes a USB device that is simply a jump drive with a breath tube attached that can be plugged into any standard computer.

=== Acoustic wind instrument conversion to software MIDI as wind control ===
Through the 1990s the major hardware-based wind controllers improved through successive models and a number of minor, and less commercially successful, controllers were introduced. These software solutions for a time were the only viable bridge between the woodwind or brass player and the synthesizer. But dating back to the 1980s a lesser known software-based alternative began to emerge. With a software-based conversion program the musician plays an ordinary wind instrument into a microphone at which point a software program (sometimes with dedicated computer hardware) interpreted the pitch, dynamics, and expression of this acoustic sound and generates a standard MIDI data stream just in time to play along with the performer through a synthesizer.

While the first commercial product attempting this approach dates back to the Fairlight Voicetracker VT-5 of 1985, a more successful modern approach using software on personal computers (combined with a digital audio workstation and softsynths) is relatively new. Two more recent examples of this highly unusual archaic approach were Thing-1 from ThingTone Software, and Digital Ear Realtime from Epinoisis Software.

== Range of expression ==
Due in part to their fast and sensitive key switching and breath sensing systems both the hardware and software based wind controllers put precise demands on a player who hopes to play with technical mastery. An accomplished woodwind or brass player may find that a hardware or software based wind controller will produce an unwanted note (called a "glitch") even at the slightest imperfection in fingering or articulation technique. As the better recordings show, these difficulties can be overcome with practice.

In contrast to live performance with a wind controller, and in response to these technical challenges, some "performances" in recordings are achieved through careful post-processing or note-by-note insertion and editing using a notation or sequencer program.

Virtually all current synthesizers and their sound libraries are designed to be played primarily with a keyboard controller, whereby the player often reserves one hand to manipulate the many real-time controls to determine how the instrument sounds, perhaps using a foot to manipulate an expression pedal.

Wind controller players do not have access to as many of these controls and thus are often limited in exploiting all of the potential voicings and articulation changes of their synthesizers, but the technologies of physical modeling (Yamaha VL70-m), sample modeling and hybrid technologies (SWAM engine) promise more expression control for wind controller players. Furthermore, sound designers are paying more attention to the different playing idioms in which their sounds will be used. For example, certain percussion sounds do not work well with a wind controller simply because playing a struck instrument it is not idiomatic to the woodwind, whereas synthesized instruments that model the acoustic properties of a woodwind will seem fitting and natural to a wind controller player.

A few of the many hardware (Yamaha, Roland, Akai, Kurzweill, Aodyo) and software (Native Instruments, Garritan, SampleModeling, Sample Logic, LinPlug, Audio Modeling) synthesizers provide specific support for wind controllers, and they vary widely with respect to how well they emulate acoustic wind, brass, and string instruments. The SWAM technology, devised by Audio Modeling, has specific settings for Yamaha, EWI, Sylphyo and Aerophone wind controllers and has succeeded in producing very rapid natural responsiveness with their woodwinds and bowed strings virtual instruments. Also Samplemodeling has specific settings for wind controllers on their Kontakt-based brass. That said, virtually all current synthesizers respond to MIDI continuous controllers and the data provided by wind controller breath and lip input can usually be routed to them in an expressive way.

An example of a hardware synthesizer with wind controller support is the Yamaha VL70-m which uses physical modeling synthesis. Physical modeling allows for a unique level of responsiveness to the control signals sent from a wind controller. The emulation of acoustic instrument sounds varies in quality. The VL70-m is able to connect directly to the Yamaha WX series of controllers and via MIDI to the Akai and other wind controllers. Similarly, an example of a software synthesizer with support for wind controller playing is the Zebra synthesizer from Urs Heckmann, Apple's ES2 softsynth, Korg's Mono/Poly softsynth, Audio Modeling's SWAM instruments, and many others. Whatever synth is used, it will need to be set up with specially designed breath responsive patches for optimal response to a wind controller.

== Manufacturers ==
The major manufacturers of wind controllers are Akai Professional, Roland, and Yamaha. As of the beginning of 2022 the available mass production wind controllers include the Akai EWI SOLO, EWI5000, Roland Aerophone models AE-01, AE-05, AE-10, AE-20 and AE-30, Aodyo Sylphyo. Less commonly available model is Synthophone. Also there are ultra low volume handmade instruments that are nonetheless advanced (owing to clever use of off the shelf electronics) such as the Berglund NuRad, NuEVI and WARBL from Mowry Stringed Instruments.

Models out of production and discontinued include the Akai EWI USB (discontinued 2022), 4000s (discontinued 2019). Also 20th century (part analogue) models from Akai such as the 3020, 3000 and 1000. Older discontinued models from Yamaha include WX11, WX7 and WX5. Casio offered more toy-like offerings including the DH-100, DH-200, DH-500 and DH-800.

== Wind controllers with saxophone fingerings ==
=== Synthophone ===
The Synthophone is a Wind Controller synthesizer. It is a MIDI sax offering real sax fingerings and a standard sax embouchure. The MIDI hardware allows the key action as well as breath and lip pressure to be read as MIDI data. Since it is a saxophone, the fingerings are the same with some additions - Several combinations allow real-time editing of patches and harmony. The instrument has made several appearances at the NAMM Show, including in 1997.

=== Others ===
After the Synthophone, several other MIDI saxes have been released that offer real sax fingerings: in 2019 the Travel Sax by Odisei Music, in 2020 the Yamaha YDS-150 digital saxophone, the Emeo in 2020, and the smaller YDS-120 in 2023. These MIDI saxes have sensors for breath pressure to adjust the volume, but they do not read lip pressure and thus do not allow the pitch to be controlled by the embouchure or by the manner of breathing. With the YDS-150, pitch bend can be achieved using a thumb toggle. The Travel Sax, the YDS-150 and the Emeo allow for voice editing using a Bluetooth-connected mobile app, whilst the YDS-120 requires USB connection for editing.

== See also ==
- Akai EWI
- Eigenharp
- Lyricon
- Variophon
- Yamaha WX5
