= Ekspress (disambiguation) =

Ekspress is a series of Russian satellites.

Expres (also Ekspres) is a Ukrainian newspaper.

Ekspress, Ekspres, or Expres may also refer to:

- Ekspress (satellite bus), a satellite bus designed by ISS Reshetnev
- Eesti Ekspress, an Estonian newspaper
- Ekspres Lviv, a Ukrainian ice hockey team
- Rádio Expres, a Slovak radio station

== See also ==
- EXPRES, the Extreme Precision Spectrograph, an instrument used in searching for exoplanets
- List of Ekspress satellites
- Express (disambiguation)
