= The Expressions =

The Expressions may refer to:

- The Expressions, American rhythm & blues band that backed Lee Fields
- The Expression, Australian synth-pop band
