= L'Express (disambiguation) =

L'Express is a French weekly news magazine.

L'Express may also refer to:

- L'Express Airlines, a commuter airline in the southern United States between 1989 and 1992
- L'Express de Madagascar, a French-language daily newspaper published in Madagascar
- L'Express de Timmins, a Canadian weekly newspaper
- L'Express (Mauritius), a daily newspaper published in Mauritius since 1963
- L'Express (restaurant), a French bistro in Montreal, Canada
- L'Express (Switzerland), a daily newspaper published in Neuchâtel, Switzerland
- L'Express (Toronto) (formerly L'Express de Toronto), a French-language weekly newspaper published in Toronto, Canada
- L'Express, a bilingual Swiss paper published in Biel/Bienne that merged into the Journal du Jura and the Bieler Tagblatt
- L'Express (Ottawa), a Canadian weekly newspaper
- Le Vif/L'Express, a French-language weekly news magazine published in Brussels, Belgium

== See also ==
- Express (disambiguation)
