= Expressivity =

Expressivity, expressiveness, and expressive power may refer to:

- Expressivity (genetics), variations in a phenotype among individuals carrying a particular genotype
- Expressive loan, a type of loanword in phono-semantic matching
- Expressive power (computer science) of a programming language
- Expressive suppression, an aspect of emotion regulation
- Expressive therapies, the use of creative arts as therapy
- Expressive timing, musical phenomenon
- Expressives or ideophones, linguistic word class

== See also ==
- Expression (disambiguation)
