= Expression (architecture) =

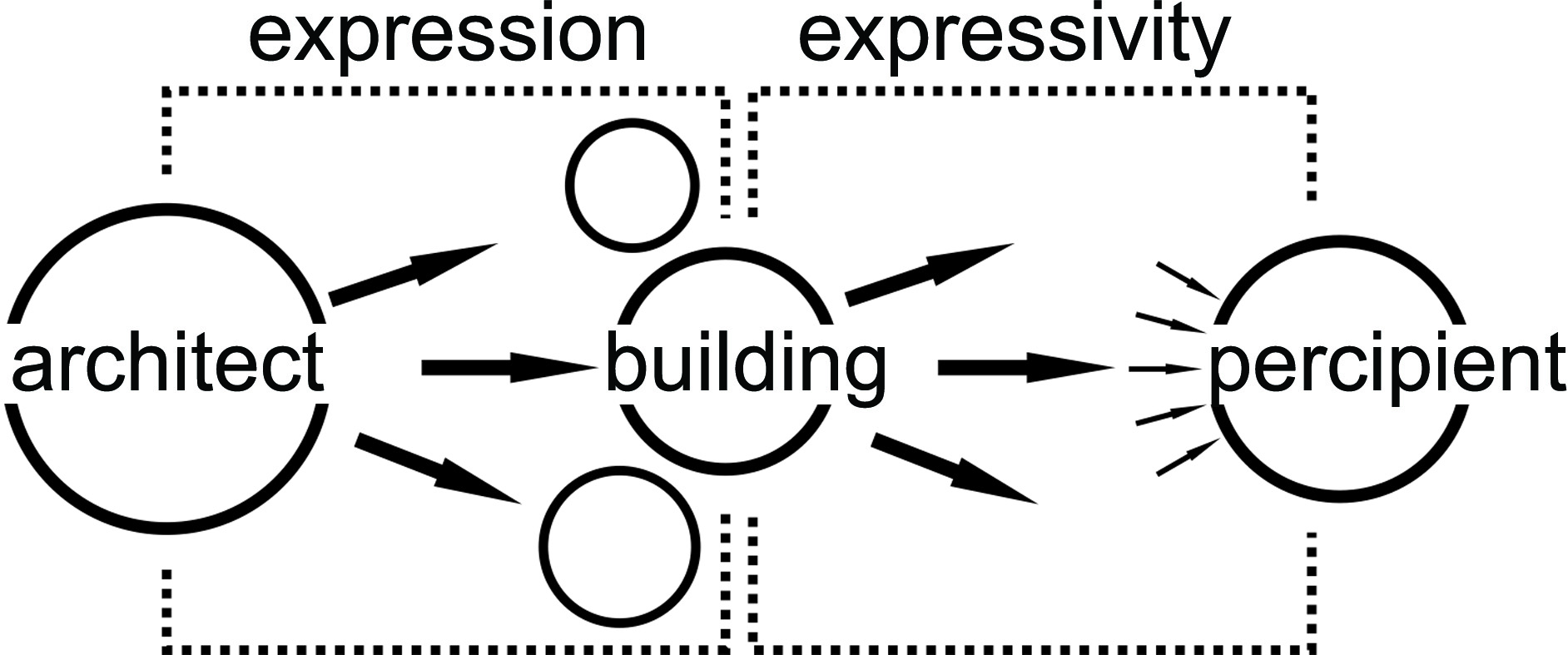
Expression and Expressivity

Expression (Lat. expressio) in architecture implies a clear and authentic displaying of the character or personality of an individual (architect). The expression is often identified with the architectural movement of Expressionism, whose main starting point and aim is to present and express what has been "seen" or experienced in the inner eye of the mind, heart and soul, i.e. to express the subjective moods and feelings without referring to conventional and "objective" values, judgements and truths.

== Meaning ==
The main problem in the critical analysis of the theoretical interpretations of the concept of expression in architecture, lies in the fact that the concept of expression is used in different ways in different fields of science and art. Regarding the concept of expression, the following interpretations can often be found:

- an activity or way of transforming an idea into words;
- showing emotions, feelings etc.;
- conveying emotions by way of music, images etc.;
- facial expression showing mood or emotion;
- choice of words, phrases, syntax, intonation etc., in communication;
- a specific phrase commonly used to express something etc.

In the widest sense, the concept of expression refers to the activity undertaken with a specific intention. However, what is the aim of expressing something will depend on the field in which the term is used.

With this in mind, some authors emphasize the unconscious or spontaneous character of expression, while others emphasize its cognitive aspect. Expression can also be defined as part of the communication process which consists of two complementary components, expression (transmitted information) and impression (received information).

== See also ==
- Expression
- Expressionism
- Expressivity
