= Eigenharp =

Brand of electronic instruments

Eigenharp is a brand of electronic instruments made by Eigenlabs, a company based in Devon, UK. The "instrument" is in essence a highly flexible and portable controller, with the sound being actually generated in the software it drives.

== History ==
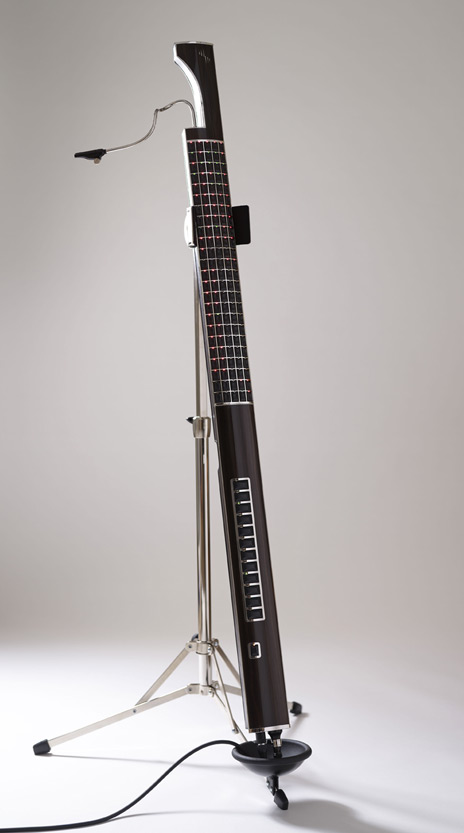
An Eigenharp Alpha-model

Eigenharp was invented by web entrepreneur and musician John Lambert. As a member of the ambient trance group Shen, Lambert felt that the electronic instruments were not as emotive or expressive as guitars or human voices. After selling his internet company, Hyperlink, he founded Eigenlabs in 2001 and began 8 years of development that resulted in the Eigenharp. The Alpha model was introduced in 2009, followed by the Pico in 2010 and the Tau in 2012.

== Models ==
The instrument comes in three models: Alpha, Tau, and Pico, in decreasing order of size. Each has a breath-pipe, a key matrix (120, 72, and 18) and a ribbon controller. The Alpha and Tau also have 12 percussion keys each and a headphone output. The Alpha also has microphone preamplifier with an input on the instrument as well as a second ribbon controller.

== Characteristics ==
Characteristics of all of the instruments are:

- A matrix of velocity sensitive multi-expressive keys, each of which act like a 6-way analog joystick. This allows the simultaneous pitch bend and modulation (or other parameters) of each played note individually.
- A stick-like vertical form factor akin to a sitar for the larger models or a flute in the smaller ones.
- A built-in wind controller, giving the larger versions of the instrument an appearance similar to a bassoon.
- One or two ribbon controller strips.
- The software is available as open-source under the GPLv3 and runs both on Macintosh and Windows.

Additionally, the larger models have:

- A series of percussion keys
- A built-in step sequencer with indicator LEDs for each key.
- A headphone amplifier with an output on the instrument
