= Auburn and District News =

The Auburn & District News was an English-language local community tabloid newspaper published by Levick & Son, at their office at 50 Auburn Road, Auburn in Sydney, Australia, and printed at their works at 31A Pitt Street, Sydney.

The first issue was published on Thursday 15 August 1929 and circulated for free in the towns of Auburn, Lidcombe, Berala, Regents Park, Silverwater and surrounding districts, with a guaranteed circulation of 6,000.

Content included reports of Auburn Municipal Council and local community organisations, and information on radio broadcasting and motoring issues, with copy by the NRMA featured prominently.

It is not known when the Auburn & District News ceased publication.

== Availability ==
Only one issue of the Auburn & District News (Vol. 1, No. 16, dated Thursday, 28 November 1929), is available at the State Library of New South Wales.

Gosford Micrographics Pty Ltd filmed the only surviving issue of the Auburn & District News, along with orphan issues of The Express, a newspaper that also covered the Auburn, Lidcombe and Homebush districts, onto a single reel of microfilm in April 2000. This microfilm can be viewed at the State Library of New South Wales, and the library services of Cumberland Council and the City of Parramatta Council.

Issue number 16 of the Auburn & District News is available online via the National Library of Australia Trove digitised newspaper website.

== See also ==
- List of newspapers in Australia
- List of defunct newspapers of Australia
- List of newspapers in New South Wales
- The Express (Granville newspaper)
