= Xpress =

Xpress may refer to:

== Arts, entertainment and media ==
- Xpress (TV series), a British multi-cultural entertainment television series
- X-Press 2, an electronic and dance music trio from England
- Xpress Radio, a student radio station based in Cardiff
- XPRESS, UAE a weekly tabloid newspaper in the United Arab Emirates
- Desi Xpress, a former national weekly entertainment newspaper published in the UK
- Fitzroy Xpress, an Australian Aboriginal country rock band
- Guitar Xpress, an original series on the Video On Demand network Mag Rack
- Ottawa XPress, an alternative newsweekly
- Golden Gate XPress, the newspaper of San Francisco State University

== Businesses and organizations ==
- XPress Telecom, a wireless telecommunication provider in Jordan
- Xpress Motorsports, a NASCAR Craftsman Truck Series team
- X Press, a British publishing company founded in 1992 by Dotun Adebayo and Steve Pope
- X-Press Feeders, a Singaporean shipping company
- Nashville Xpress, a former American minor league baseball team based in Nashville, Tennessee

== Technology ==
- Xpress 200 and Xpress 3200, computer chipsets by ATI Technologies
- Xpress technology, a frame-bursting approach to improve wireless LAN performance by Broadcom
- FICO Xpress, a suite of mathematical modeling and optimization tools
- Xpress Transport Protocol, a transport layer protocol for high-speed networks
- XPRESS, a Trans-Proteomic Pipeline software
- XPRESS, the name for two different fast compression algorithms developed by Microsoft:
  - one is used in Microsoft Exchange's LDAP protocol, Windows CE, and the Windows hibernation file
  - the other is used in the Windows Imaging Format and the Distributed File System Replication Protocol
- Nokia Xpress, a defunct web browser
- QuarkXPress, a professional page layout application

== Transportation ==
- GRTA Xpress, a regional passenger bus service in metropolitan Atlanta
- Xpress 400, a plan for tolled express lanes on Interstate 4 through Orlando, Florida
- FlyAsianXpress, a Malaysian regional airline now branded AirAsia X
- Scheidt & Bachmann Ticket XPress, a passenger-operated, self-service railway ticket issuing system
- Desert Xpress or XpressWest, former names for Brightline West, a planned high-speed train service from California to Nevada
- Birmingham Xpress, a bus rapid transit system in Birmingham, Alabama

== Other uses ==
- X*Press X*Change, an obsolete computer-based news-ticker-style newsfeed service
- Xpress (roller coaster) at Walibi Holland in the Netherlands
- MP Xpress, a roller coaster located in Movie Park Germany

== See also ==
- Express (disambiguation)
- Press (disambiguation)
- X (disambiguation)
