= The Expression (album) =

Studio album by The Expression
- Released: October 1983
- Studio: Trafalgar Studios, Studios 301, Sydney
- Genre: Synthpop; pop rock; new wave
- Label: Mushroom
- Producer: Charles Fisher

The Expression chronology
The Expression (1983)	Conscience (1985)

Singles from The Expression
- 1. "With Closed Eyes" Released: February 1983; 2. "Decisions" Released: August 1983; 3. "Total Eclipse" Released: November 1983; 4. "Present Communication" Released: March 1984

The Expression is the debut studio album by Australian pop rock, new wave group The Expression. The album peaked at No. 55 on the Kent Music Report Albums Chart.

== Track listing ==
Side A (L 38005)
No.	Title	Writer(s)	Length
1.	"Present Communication"	Neville Dowling, Tom Haran	4:56
2.	"With Closed Eyes"	Haran	3:38
3.	"Total Eclipse"	Dowling	5:26
4.	"Keep Appointments"	Dowling, Haran	4:48
5.	"Right to a Slice"	Haran	3:18

Side B
No.	Title	Writer(s)	Length
1.	"Dawn, Day & Sleep"	Andrew Wong Yen	4:53
2.	"Decisions"	Haran	3:36
3.	"You & Me"	Wong Yen, Dowling, Haran	5:07
4.	"About Tomorrow"	Haran	4:37
5.	"Satisfied Strangers"	Haran	4:06

== Charts ==
Chart (1983)	Peak position
Australian Kent Music Report Albums Chart	55
