= Plymouth Expresso =

Overview
- Manufacturer: Plymouth
- Production: 1994

Body and chassis
- Class: Concept car

The Plymouth Expresso was a 1994 compact concept car by Plymouth. Its toy-like appearance (seen on rear-view mirrors, hubcaps, windows, and overall design) may be one of the reasons why it never went into production. The Expresso name however was used again as a trim package on the Plymouth Neon from 1997 to 1999, the Plymouth Voyager from 1998 to 1999, and the Plymouth Breeze from 1998 to 1999. The Expresso is seen today as the first in a series of concepts that led to the Chrysler PT Cruiser.
