= Arcadia Education Centre =

School in South Kanarchor, Bangladesh

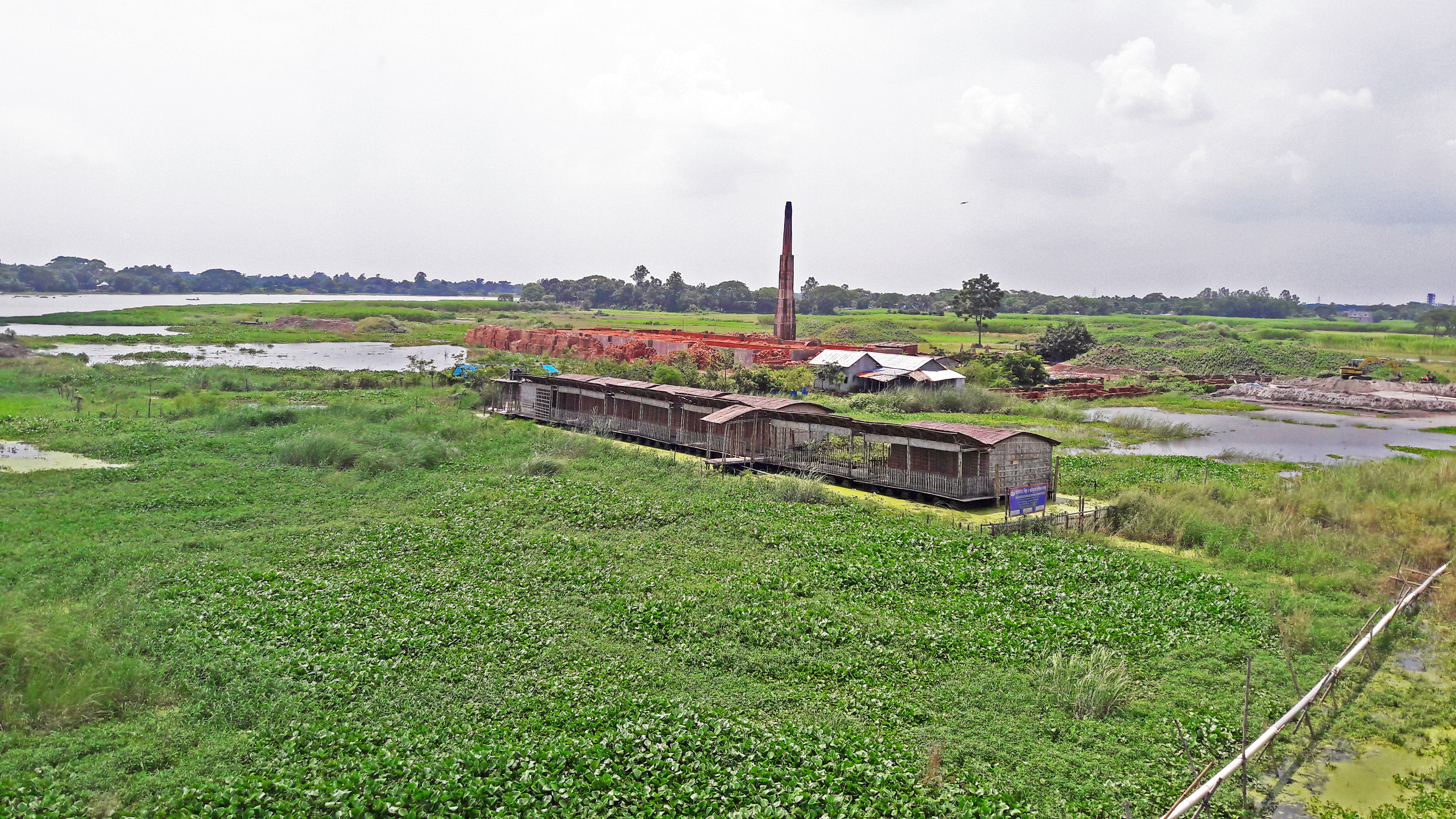

The Arcadia Education Centre (School) is located in South Kanarchor, Bangladesh, on the bank of the Dhaleshwari River. The modular, amphibious structure adapts to seasonal flooding using an innovative design based on traditional building techniques and incorporating local materials. The facility contains a preschool, hostel, nursery, and vocational training centre.

== Amphibious architecture ==
The Maleka Welfare Trust purchased a patch of land so they could relocate one of their preschools and add additional social facilities. The land is flooded five months of the year, and its topography is incompatible with conventional solutions to this challenge.

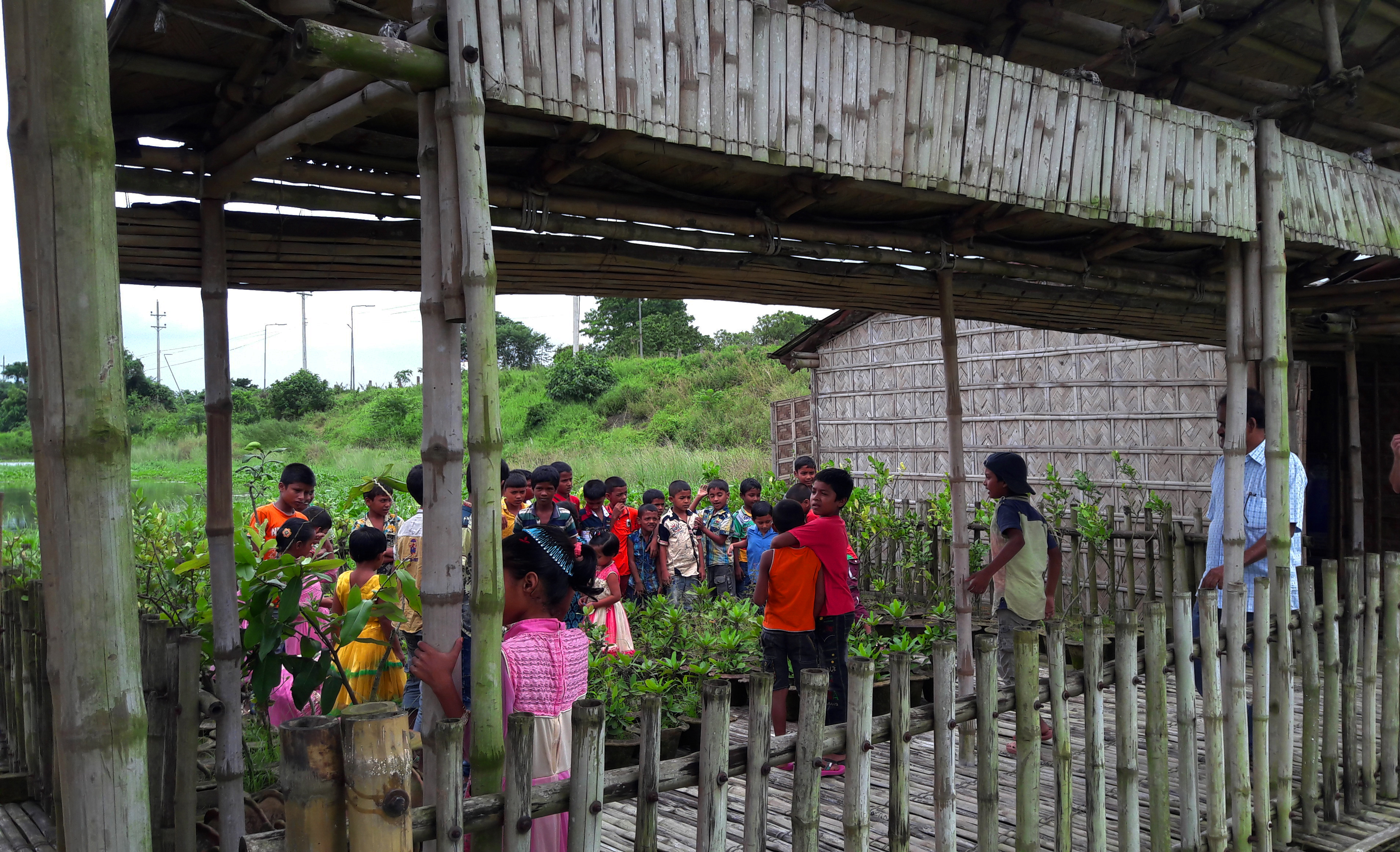

Architect Saif Ul Haque Sthapati of Dhaka, Bangladesh designed a buoyant platform that floats tethered during the rainy season and settles back to the ground during the dry season, allowing the facility to remain operational year-round. In addition to this cost-effective solution to flooding, the building is made of inexpensive materials, including several local bamboo varieties and upcycled materials such as steel drums and car tires. The building materials and techniques are based on traditional house construction techniques used in the area. This amphibious structure that rises with water levels could be the potential solution to rising sea levels because of climate change.

The structure is open to nature, allowing students to benefit from natural light while learning from their surroundings.

== Maleka Welfare Trust ==
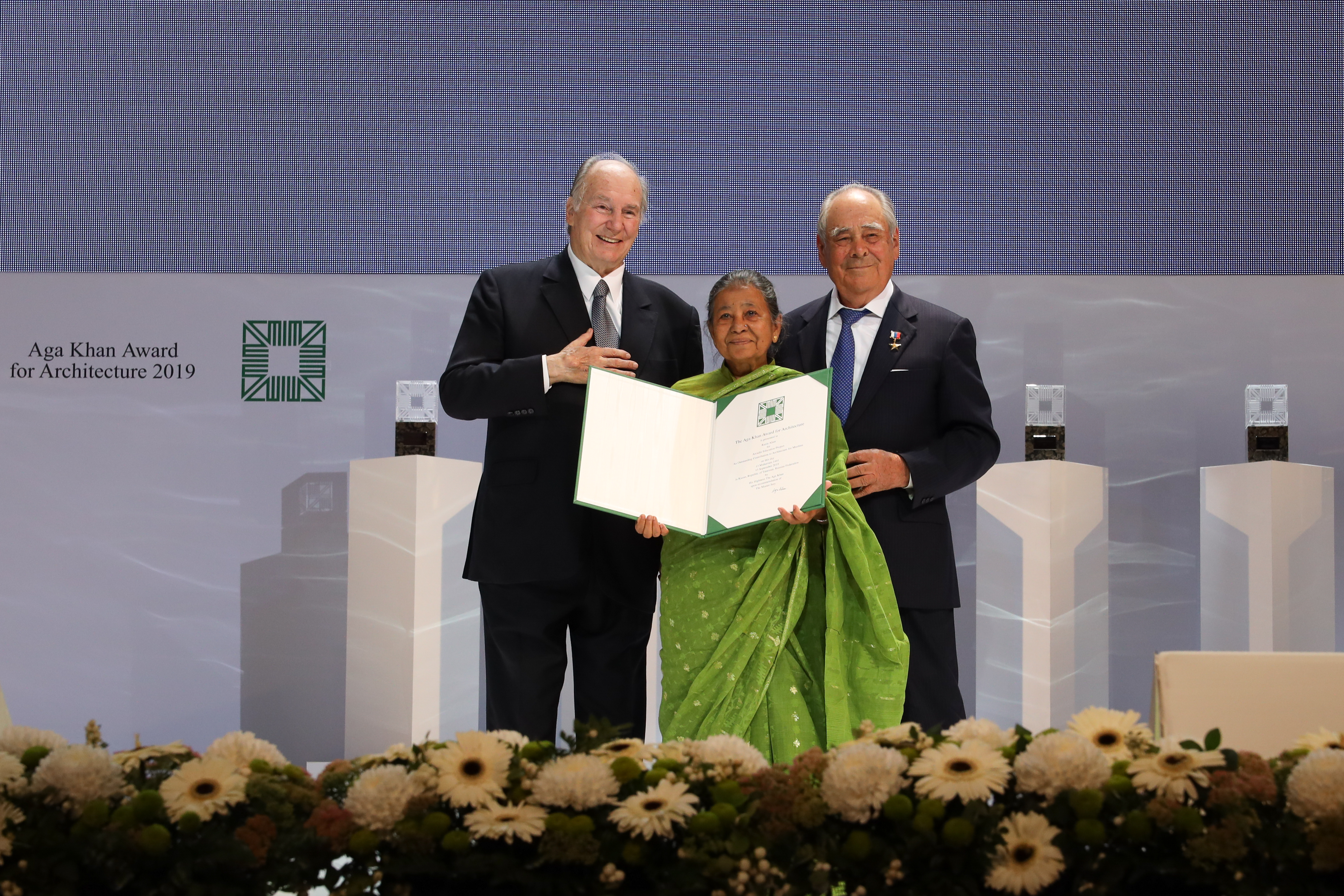
Razia Alam from Bangladesh is presented an AKAA 2019 certificate for the Arcadia Education Project, South Kanarchor, Bangladesh, by His Highness the Aga Khan and Mintimer Shaimiev, State Counselor of the Republic of Tatarstan.

The Maleka Welfare Trust is a private social welfare organization. Their programs include preschools, a vocational training centre, a nursery, and a hostel for single women.

The Aga Khan Award for Architecture announced the Maleka Welfare Trust's Arcadia Education Project as one of the 2019 Award winners for its thoughtful response to flooding using local materials and traditional building techniques. Razia Alam was presented the Aga Khan Award for Architecture by His Highness the Aga Khan and Mintimer Shaimiev, State Counselor of the Republic of Tatarstan on September 13, 2019.

Bangladesh is consistently ranked among the countries most at risk from climate change. In 2017, massive rainfall caused loss of life and displacement of people. Affordable and locally sustainable architectural models like the Arcadia facility improve the everyday lives of Bangladeshis and other affected populations.
