= The Express (Granville newspaper) =

The Express was a free English language local community tabloid newspaper, printed and published weekly by Herbert Denley, at 58 Good Street, Granville, New South Wales, Australia. The newspaper circulated in the suburbs of Auburn, Lidcombe, Berala, Regents Park, Flemington, Homebush and surrounding districts, reporting on social, community, sporting and local government activities, and provided local business and classified advertising.

The first issue of The Express was published in 1924, and by June 1933 the paper had a guaranteed circulation of 10,000.

The Express continued publication until the early 1950s.

== Availability ==
Only three issues of The Express (June 22, 1933; October 19, 1934; and May 2, 1935) are held at the State Library of New South Wales, stored in offsite storage.

Gosford Micrographics Pty Ltd filmed two issues of The Express (Vol. 9, No. 19, dated Thursday, June 22, 1933 and Vol. 11, No. 9, dated Thursday, May 2, 1935), along with the sole surviving issue of the Auburn and District News, onto a single reel of microfilm in April 2000. This microfilm can be viewed at the State Library of New South Wales, and the library services of Cumberland Council and the City of Parramatta Council.

The 1933 and 1935 issues of The Express are available online via the National Library of Australia Trove digitised newspaper website.

== See also ==
- List of newspapers in Australia
- List of defunct newspapers of Australia
- List of newspapers in New South Wales
- Auburn and District News
