= Expresso spreadsheet =

eXpresso Spreadsheet Communities
- Initial release: ?
- Written in: ?
- Operating system: Any (Web-based application)
- Available in: English
- Type: Online spreadsheet
- License: ?
- Website: www.eXpressoCorp.com

eXpresso was a hosted workspace for Microsoft Office communities that became defunct in 2014. Excel spreadsheet management was the first application offered. It was among the growing number of Web 2.0, SaaS offerings in the online spreadsheet market. eXpresso served as a collaborative platform specifically for Excel business users, similar to Google Sheets, a competitor that ultimately outlasted eXpresso.

== History ==
Exploring Creative Possibilities prompted investors to present eXpresso as a standalone product. The free public beta release was introduced in August 2007.

== Subscriptions ==
Pricing was based on a subscription model which included a free version for light users or individuals. The user agreement showed that it is present in Version 1.0 beta. It had a 10 Mb space limit per user license without charge.
