= The Express (2022 film) =

- Directed by: Ruslan Bratov
- Written by: Ruslan Bratov; Mikhail Khuranov; Yevgeny Sytyy
- Produced by: Ruben Dishdishyan; Vazgen Khachatryan; Pavel Karykhalin
- Starring: Lev Zulkarnaev; Pavel Vorozhtsov; Olga Smirnova
- Cinematography: Alexander Khudokon
- Edited by: Roman Geigert
- Music by: Sergei Golikov
- Production company: Mars Media Entertainment
- Distributed by: Exponenta Film
- Release date: September 22, 2022
- Running time: 80 min.
- Country: Russia
- Language: Russian

The Express (Russian: Экспресс, romanized: Ekspress) is a 2022 Russian crime comedy-drama film directed by Ruslan Bratov.

== Plot ==
Sasha Soslanov, nicknamed Sos, a charming goofball from the Caucasian province, finds himself in the blackest period of his life. But even when he is expelled from the university, and his beloved Nina leaves for Moscow, he does not lose heart, but goes to the bookmaker's office and makes a desperate bet of several events for the last thousand rubles express (accumulator bet). An incredible combination of circumstances makes him the owner of a big win. That's just the card he loses.

== Cast ==
- Lev Zulkarnaev as Sos
- Pavel Vorozhtsov as Oleg
- Artur Khatagov as Viktor
- Olga Smirnova as Nina
- Mikhail Khuranov as physical education teacher
- Sergey Gaiterov as Gray

== Reception ==
=== Box office ===
The Express has grossed US$132 108.

=== Critical response ===
Vadim Bogdanov from InterMedia gave the film 8 out of 10, noting the good acting and views of the North Caucasus.

According to Zinaida Pronchenko, Bratov's romanticization of hopelessness is not opposed by a timid guess at all: what if, in the territory called the Russian Federation, life has as many chances to play as death.

As Vasily Stepanov notes, it is immersed in the local context, made from the beginning to the end of the movie.

== Awards ==
- Best Russian Film 2022 according to the Iskusstvo Kino.
- Window to Europe Festival: Best Film, Best Ensemble Cast, Best Cinematography.
