= The Expression =

Australian synthpop band

- Origin: Sydney, New South Wales, Australia
- Genres: New wave, synthpop
- Years active: 1981–1985
- Labels: Mushroom; A&M; What It Is; Almacantar
- Past members: See member list

The Expression were an Australian synthpop band formed in Sydney in 1981 and disbanded in 1985. Their best known single, "With Closed Eyes", was released in 1983 on Mushroom Records and peaked just inside the top thirty on the Kent Music Report.

== History ==
The Expression formed in Sydney during 1981 with local musicians Jason O'Donnell on bass and Steve Layton, who went on to work with Jon Anderson from Yes, on keyboards, although three of its members hailed previously from Western Australia. Tom Haran (vocals), Neville Dowling (keyboards, ex-Dave Warner Band), and Andrew Wong-Yen (guitar) had all played in the Perth band Visitor during the late 1970s.

By 1981 the trio had relocated to Sydney and formed The Expression, along with Stephen Manassah (bass guitar) and Steve Hopes (drums) (ex-Renee Geyer Band). They quickly established themselves on the Sydney live circuit, with a cutting edge brand of ‘new wave’ pop, combining sharp guitar riffs and haunting synthesizer melodies, topped off by Haran's unique vocal style. It was the early 1980s and a slickly produced brand of pop-rock was in order if a band/artist wanted to break into the charts, with a throng of up and coming bands all jostling for record deals and chart action (Eurogliders, Real Life, Machinations).

Mushroom Records signed The Expression to a recording deal during 1982 and the band set about working on their debut album. The band's first single was "With Closed Eyes", which entered the Australian charts in March 1983 and peaked at No. 27 nationally (No. 18 in Melbourne). The video, produced by Paul Goldman, first aired on Countdown in March 1983. The video is described as being 'worthy of some of the great Hollywood epics in terms of its cinematic scope and emotional resonance.'

The band's debut self-titled album, The Expression, recorded in Sydney and mixed in New York City, was produced by Charles Fisher (Radio Birdman, Hoodoo Gurus, Moving Pictures) was released in late 1983 and reached No. 55 on the album charts. The album was also released in the United States by A&M Records, with a different cover and slightly different track listing. A further two singles were released from the album, "Decisions", and, "Total Eclipse", both of which did not chart into the top 50. During this period drummer Steve Hopes had been replaced by Guy Slingerland (ex-Eurogliders), and soon after the live line-up of the band splintered, leaving the future of The Expression up in the air.

Haran and Dowling opted to continue to work under The Expression banner, and recruited several English based session players, including drummer Gary Burke and bassist Steve Greetham, to record material for a second album. Which was recorded in London at the Abbey Road Studios and produced by Ben Rogan (Sade) and Wally Brill. In March 1984 a new single "Present Communication" was released but failed to chart. A period of almost fifteen months elapsed before the next single from The Expression saw the light of day. "Small Brave Land" was released in July 1985 and was quickly followed by The Expression's second album Conscience, but neither managed to secure a new audience or even retain the band's previous fan base to any great degree. Haran and Dowling recruited a new stage line-up, Bill Heckenberg (drums), Tim Lumsdaine (bass) but by late 1985 the ever-evolving contemporary music scene had left The Expression behind, and soon thereafter the band called it a day.

In 2006, The Expression's two original albums were digitally remastered and released on CD by independent record label, What It Is Records, which was established by the band's former bass player, Stephen Manassah. The re-released version of Conscience included three additional tracks from the 1984 London recordings. That was followed in 2007 by an album, Rare & Un-Released, a compilation of previously unreleased live/demo material, with a bonus DVD which featured all five of the band's music videos, including "With Closed Eyes". The albums were distributed in the United States and Europe by Almacantar Records.

== Members ==
- Gary Burke – drums (1984)
- Neville Dowling – keyboards, vocals (1981–1985)
- Steve Greetham – bass guitar (1984)
- Tom Haran – vocals, guitar (1981–1985)
- Bill Heckenberg – drums (1985)
- Steve Hopes – drums (1981–1983)
- Chris Jarret – guitar (1984)
- Tim Lumsdaine – bass guitar (1985)
- Stephen Manassah – bass guitar (1981–1983)
- Guy Slingerland – drums (1983)
- Andrew Wong-Yen – guitar (1981–1983)
- Vinnie Zumo – guitar (1984)
- Steve Layton – keyboards (1981)*****Al Basch drums 1981

== Discography ==
=== Albums ===
Year	Album details	Chart peak positions
Year	Album details	AUS
1983	The Expression: Released: 1983; Label: Mushroom Records (L38005); A&M (4975); Format: Vinyl	55
1985	Conscience: Released: April 1985; Label: Mushroom (L38260); Format: Vinyl	
2007	Rare & Un-Released: Released: 2007; Label: What It Is Records/ Almacantar (AR-4241); Format: CD	

=== Singles ===
Year	Single	Album	Peak chart position
Year	Single	Album	AUS
1983	"With Closed Eyes"	The Expression	27
1983	"Decisions"	The Expression	91
1983	"Total Eclipse"	The Expression	65
1984	"Present Communication"	The Expression	-
1985	"Small Brave Land"	Conscience	-

== Awards and nominations ==
=== Countdown Music Awards ===
Countdown was an Australian pop music TV series on national broadcaster ABC-TV from 1974–1987, it presented music awards from 1979–1987, initially in conjunction with magazine TV Week. The TV Week / Countdown Awards were a combination of popular-voted and peer-voted awards.

Year	Nominee / work	Award	Result
1983	The Expression	Best Debut Album	Nominated
1983	"With Closed Eyes"	Best Video	Nominated
