= The Express (Illinois newspaper) =

Former newspaper in Illinois, US

Coordinates: 39°56′39″N 89°56′15″W

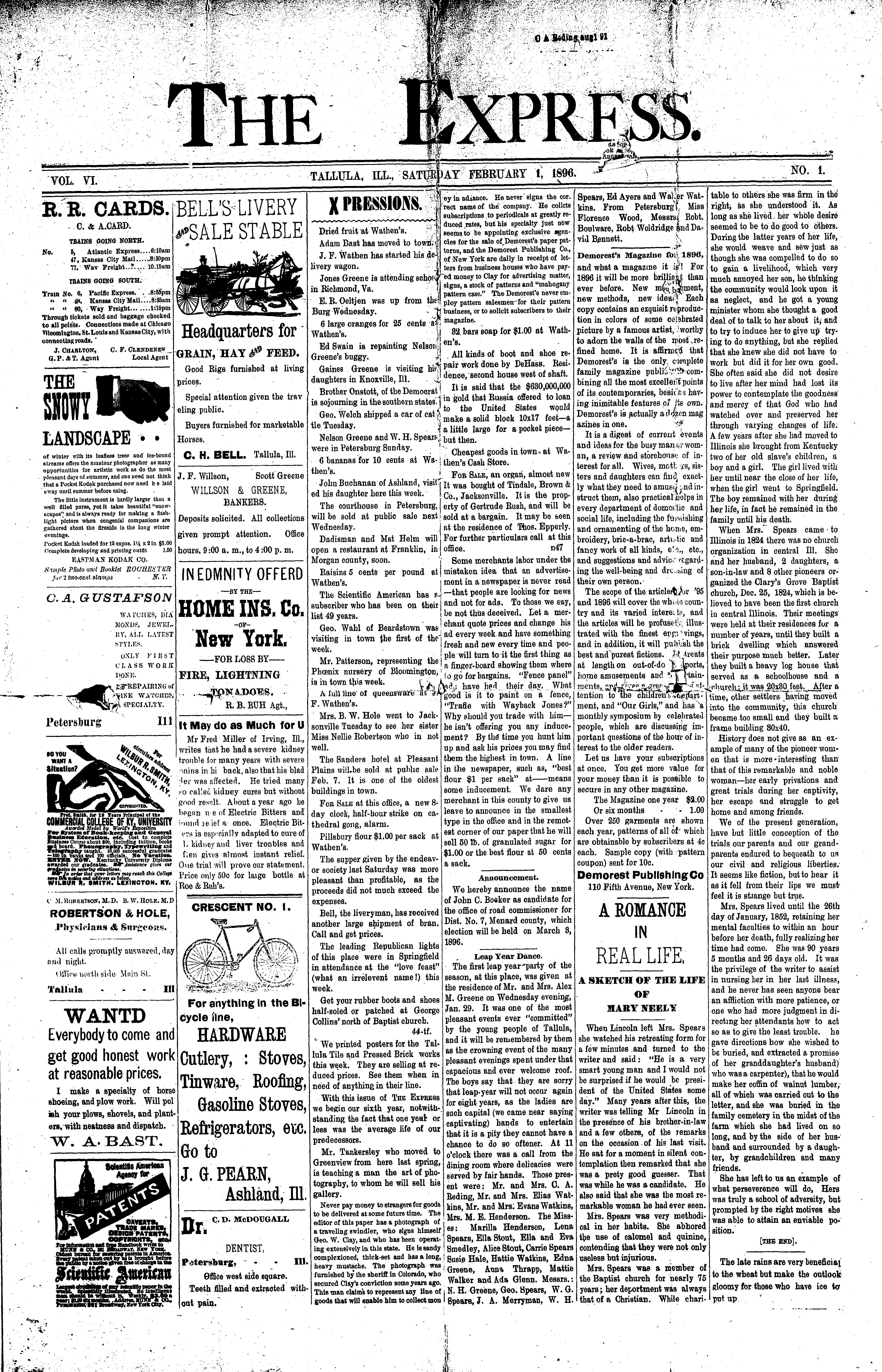
- Front page of The Express (February 1, 1896)
- Publisher: W.H. Keller
- Founded: late 1800s
- Language: American English
- City: Tallula, Illinois
- Country: United States
- OCLC number: 187304089

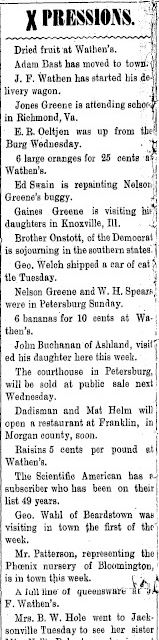
Local news in The Express (February 1, 1896)

The Express was a weekly newspaper published in the village of Tallula, Menard County, Illinois during the late 19th century. The paper contained local news as well as entertainment in the form of poems and short stories. It also included advice columns and advertisements for local stores and services. The paper was succeeded by The Tallula Journal in 1897.

== History ==
The following names were used for newspapers in Tallula:

- Tallula Observer (Tallula, Ill.) 1876–1878, OCLC 15360431
- The Express (Tallula, Ill.) 18??-1897, OCLC 187304089
- The Tallula Journal (Tallula, Ill.) 1897-1???, OCLC 25113752
- The Standard (Tallula, Ill.) 1929–1932, OCLC 25113914
- The Tallula Standard (Tallula, Ill.) 1932-????, OCLC 25113946
