= EXPRES =

American astronomical instrument

The EXtreme PREcision Spectrograph (EXPRES) is an optical fiber fed echelle instrument designed and built at the Yale Exoplanet Laboratory to be installed on the 4.3-meter Lowell Discovery Telescope operated by Lowell Observatory. It has a goal to achieve 10 cm/s radial velocity precision. It uses a laser frequency comb to calibrate the primary wavelength for EXPRES.

== See also ==
- ESPRESSO spectrograph
- HARPS3
