= Expressive timing =

Expressive timing refers to the musical phenomenon whereby a performer introduces subtle temporal nuances to an otherwise metronomic ("perfectly" timed) interpretation. This is also referred to as microtiming or microrhythm. For instance, a pianist might introduce a slight ritardando (not called for explicitly in the musical score) at the end of a phrase to convey a structural event (in this case, a phrase ending). Expressive timing has been shown to operate in different musical styles. In jazz, expressive timing plays an important role in how "swing" notes are timed.

It has also been shown empirically that simple rhythms are often performed differently from how they are notated. This aspect of rhythm production is at odds with a feature of rhythm perception—namely, that rhythms made up of complex ratios are simplified by listeners to consist of simple ratios. For example, when presented with a sequence of sounds whose interonset intervals (IOIs) are 700 – 300 – 400 milliseconds (ratios of 7:3:4), a listener might code the rhythm according to the simpler ratios 2:1:1. This is known as quantizing.

The following figure graphs timing data for a short phrase performed by John Coltrane ("Like Someone in Love" 2:42–2:45.) The Y-axis plots interonset intervals. Even though the notes are nominally sextuplets, notice how their actual durations fluctuate above and below the sextuplet's metronomic value of 162 ms.

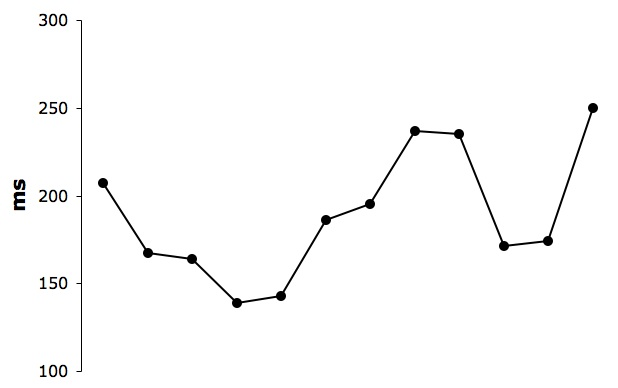
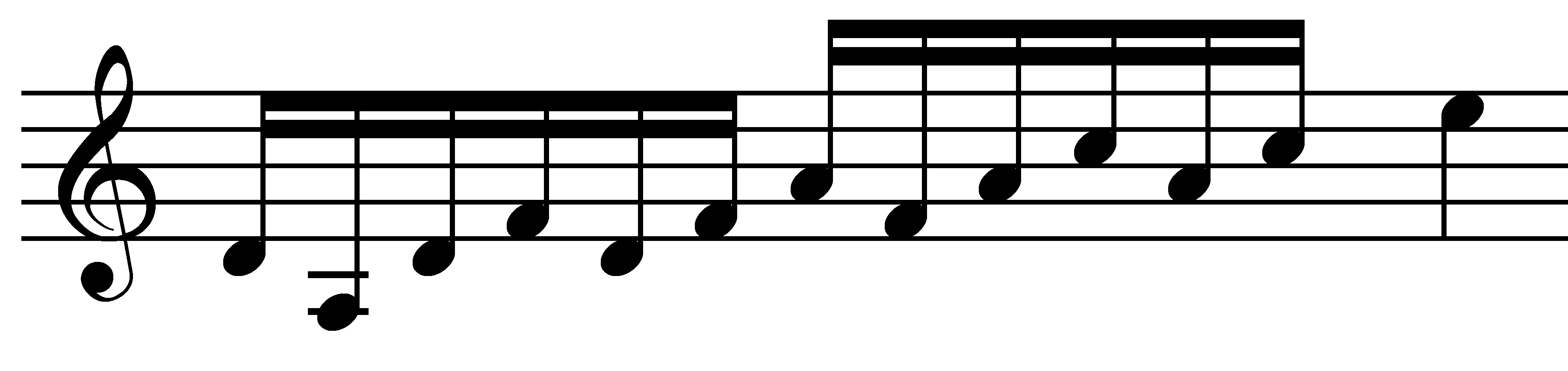
