= Window =

Opening to admit light, air, or objects

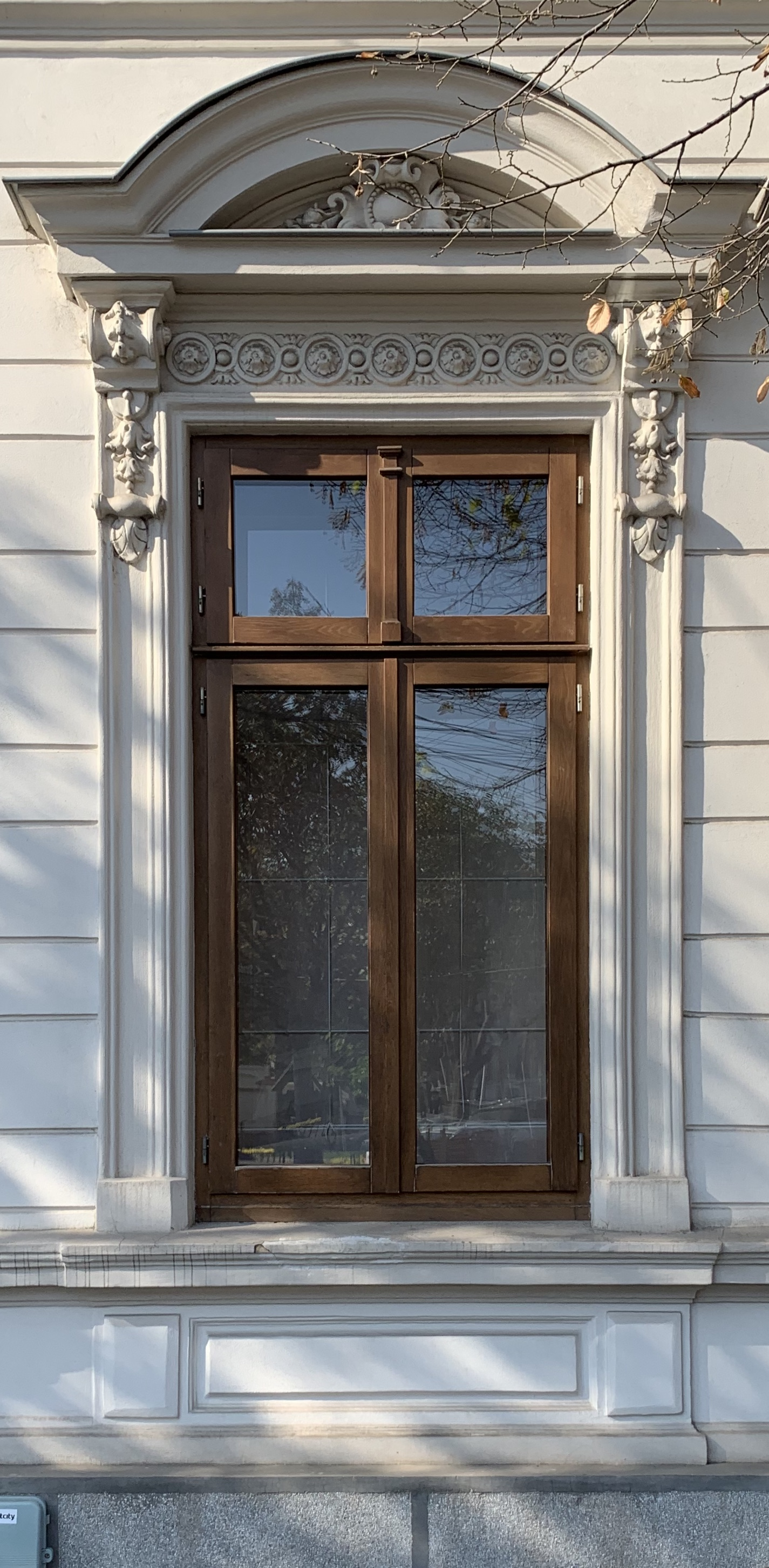
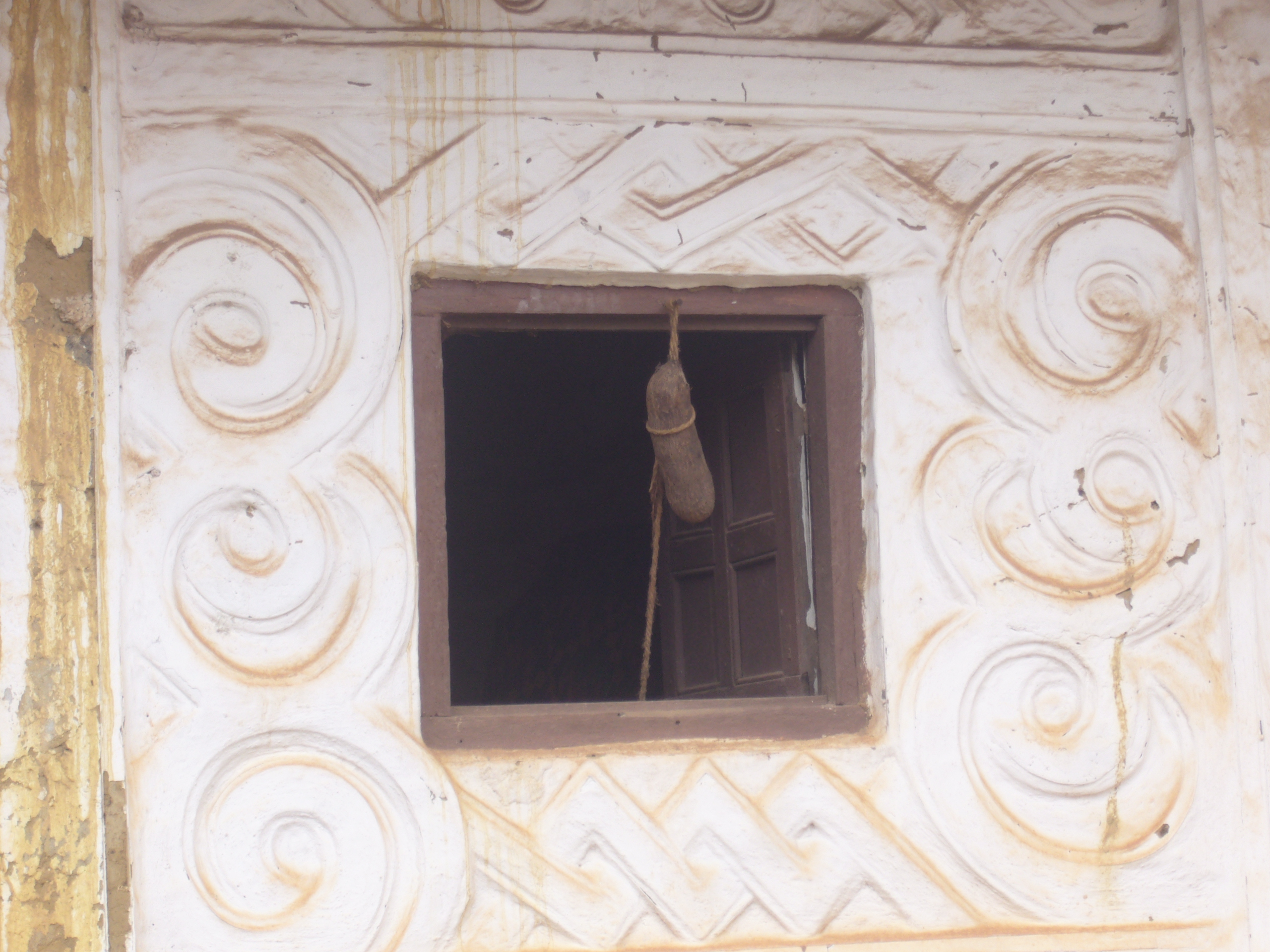
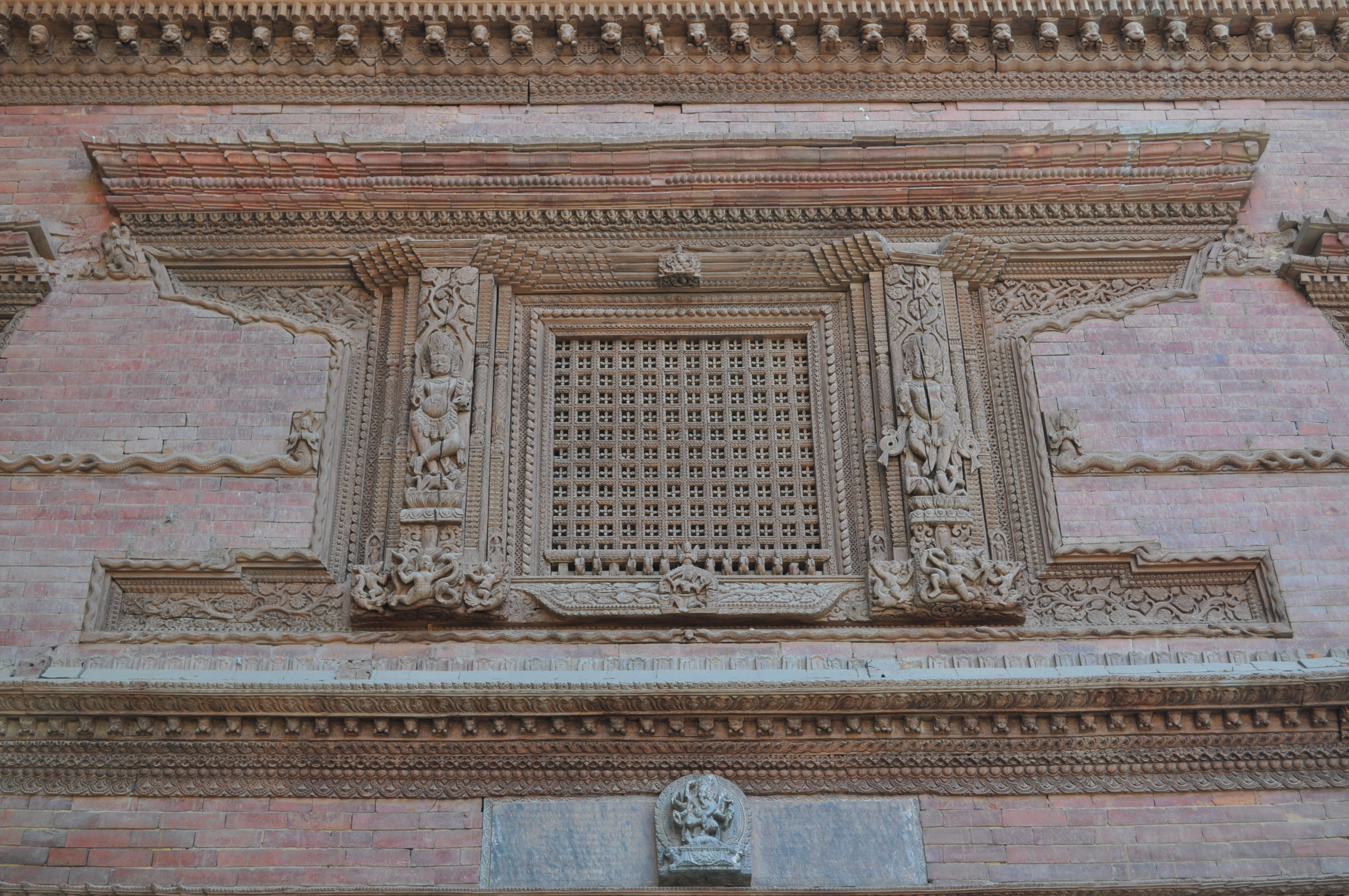
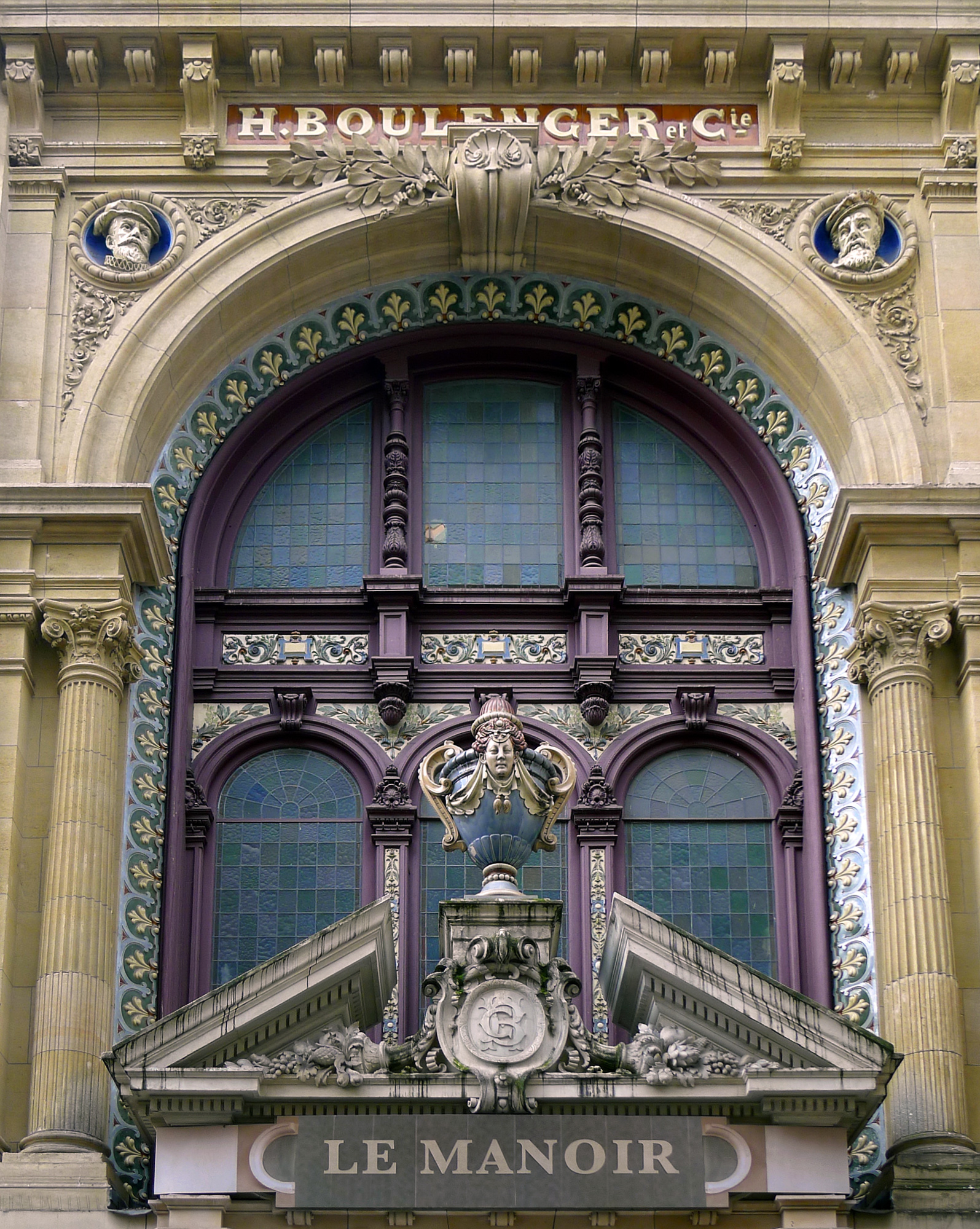
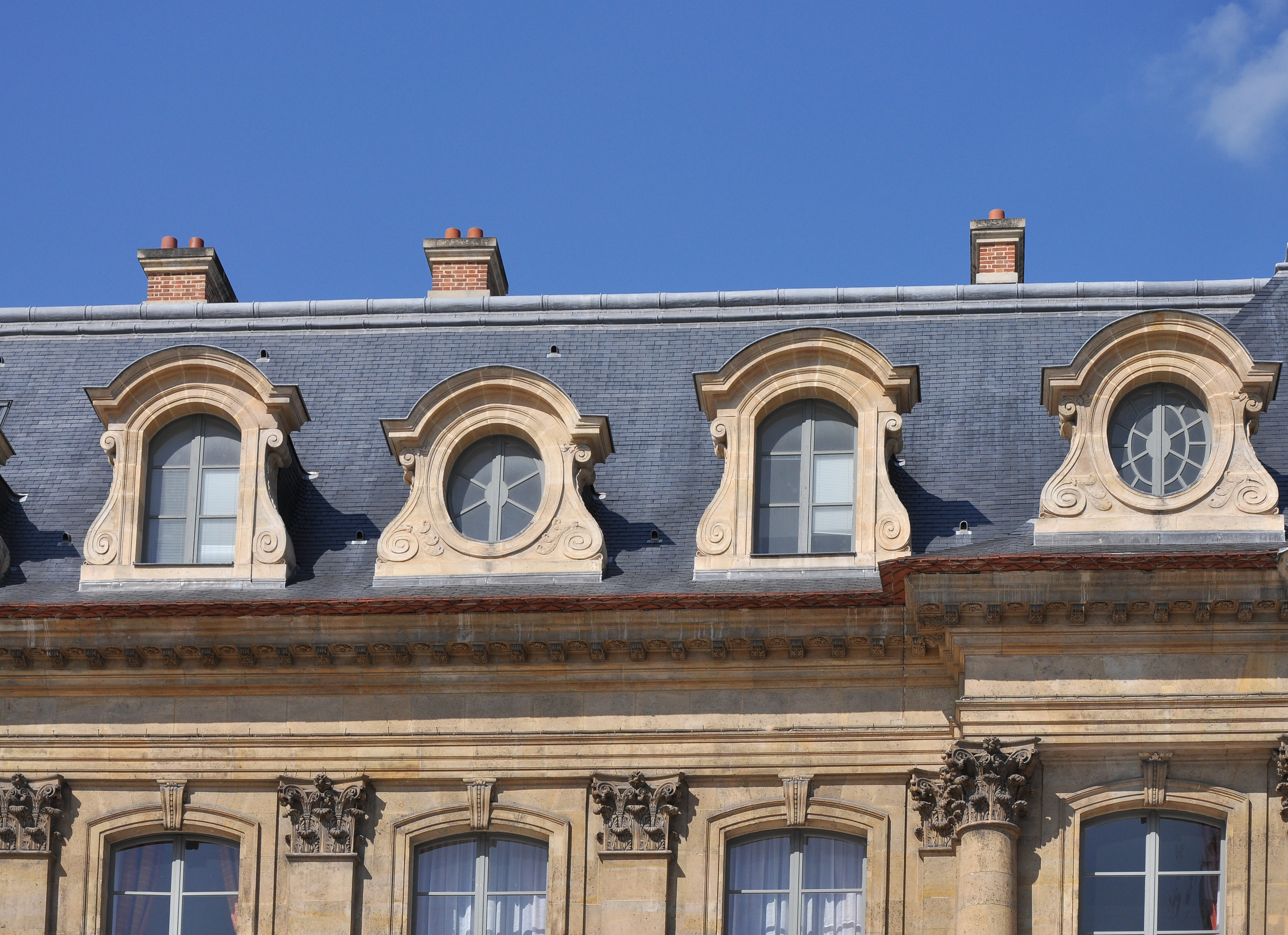
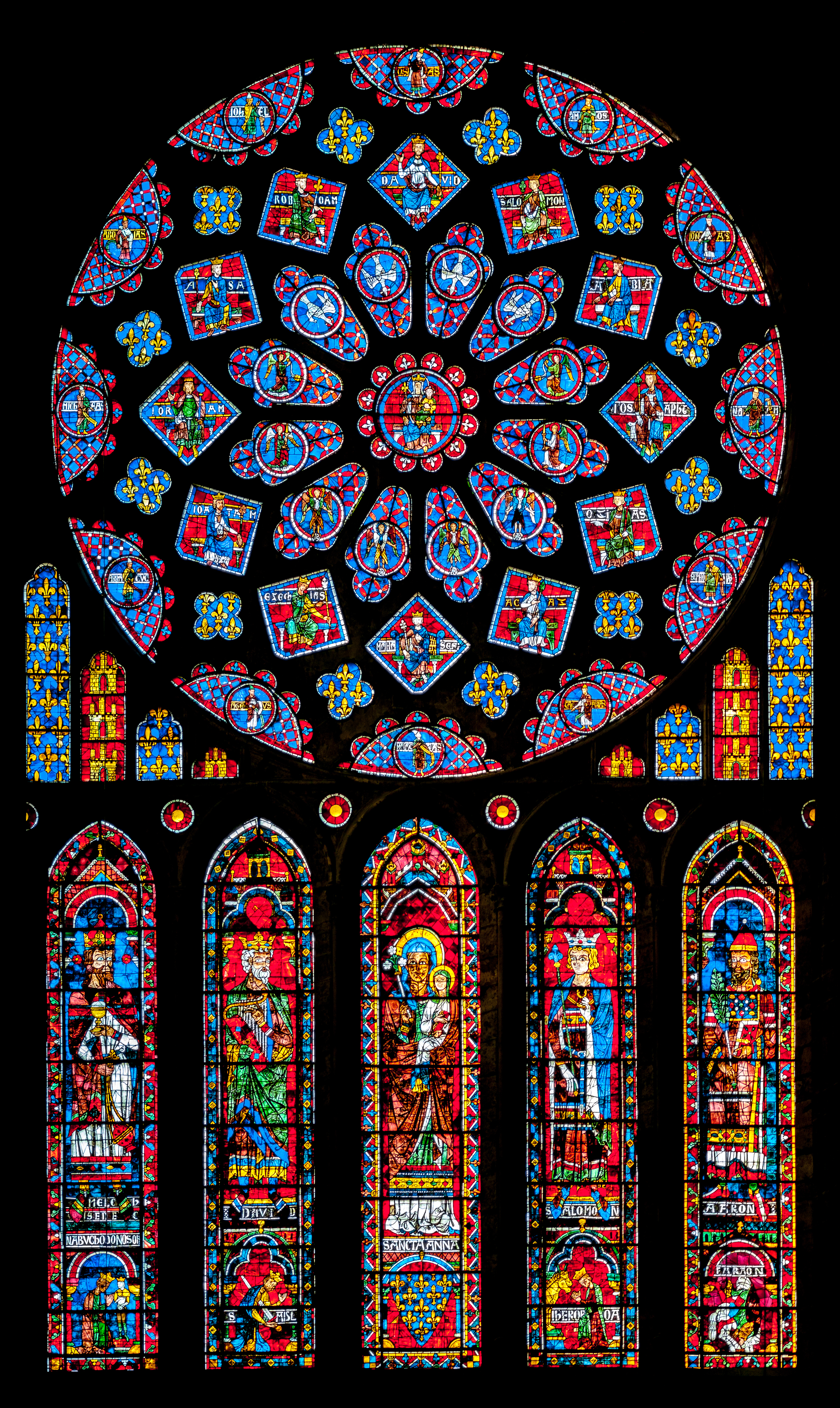
Various examples of windows

A window is an opening in a wall, door, roof, or vehicle that allows the exchange of light and sometimes allows the passage of sound and air. Modern windows are usually glazed, or covered in some other transparent or translucent material, a sash set in a frame in the opening. The sash and frame are also referred to as a window. Many glazed windows may be opened, to allow ventilation, or closed to exclude inclement weather. Windows may have a latch or similar mechanism to lock the window shut or to hold it open by various amounts.

Types include the eyebrow window, fixed windows, hexagonal windows, single-hung, and double-hung sash windows, horizontal sliding sash windows, casement windows, awning windows, hopper windows, tilt, and slide windows (often door-sized), tilt and turn windows, transom windows, sidelight windows, jalousie or louvered windows, clerestory windows, lancet windows, skylights, roof windows, roof lanterns, bay windows, oriel windows, thermal, or Diocletian, windows, picture windows, rose windows, emergency exit windows, stained glass windows, French windows, panel windows, double- or triple-paned windows, and witch windows.

== Etymology ==
The English word window originates from the Old Norse vindauga, from vindr 'wind' and auga 'eye'. In Norwegian Nynorsk and Icelandic, the Old Norse form has survived to this day (in Icelandic only as a less used word for a type of small open "window", not strictly a synonym for gluggi, the Icelandic word for 'window'). In Swedish, the word vindöga remains as a term for a hole through the roof of a hut, and in the Danish language vindue and Norwegian Bokmål vindu.

Window is first recorded in the early 13th century, and originally referred to an unglazed hole in a roof. Window replaced the Old English eagþyrl, which literally means 'eye-hole', and eagduru 'eye-door'. Many Germanic languages, however, adopted the Latin word fenestra to describe a window with glass, such as standard Swedish fönster, or German Fenster. The use of window in English is probably because of the Scandinavian influence on the English language by means of loanwords during the Viking Age. In English, the word fenester was used as a parallel until the mid-18th century. Fenestration is still used to describe the arrangement of windows within a façade, as well as defenestration, meaning 'to throw out of a window'.

== History ==
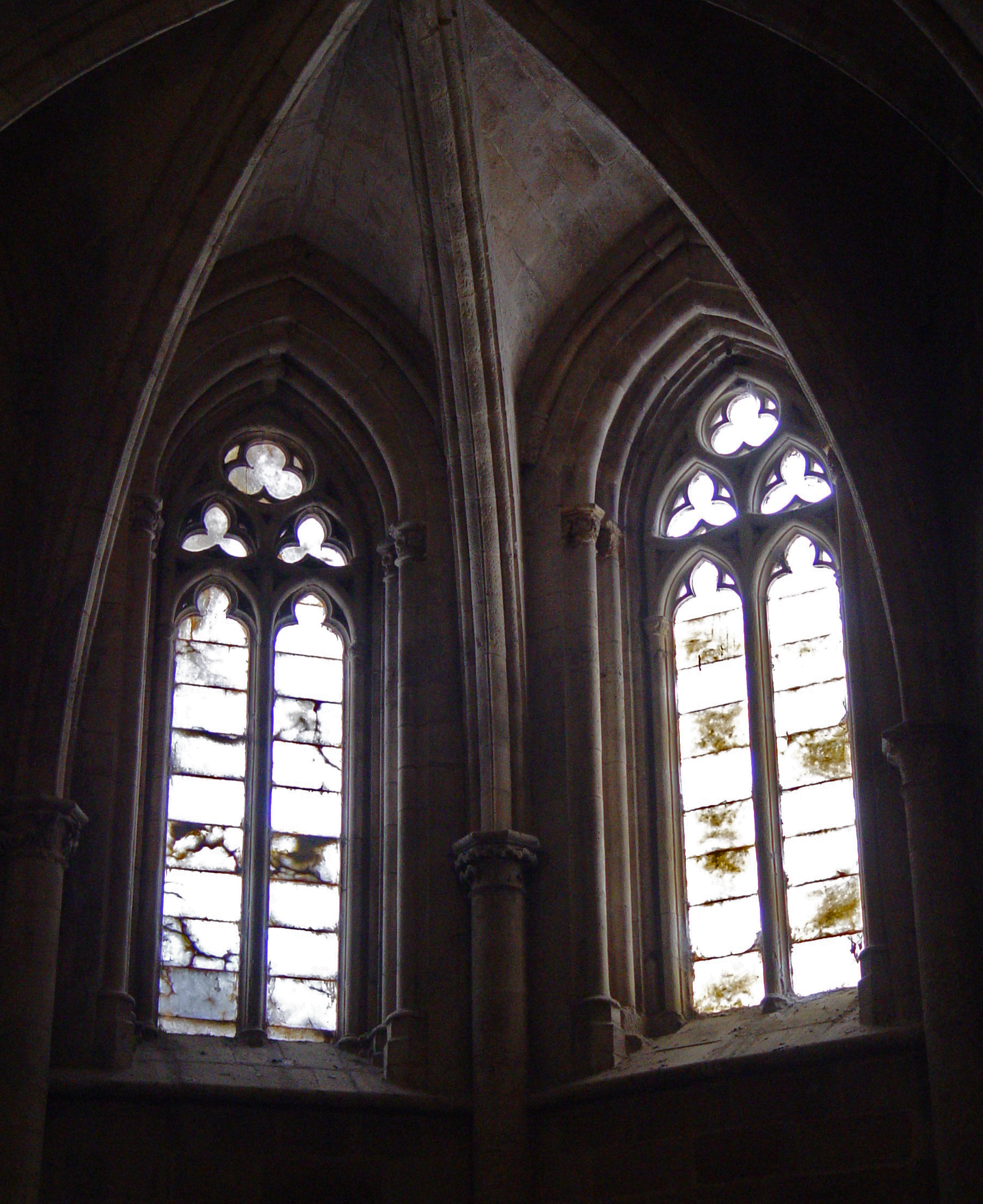
Alabaster "mullion"-divided decorative windows in Santa Maria La Major church (Morella, Spain)

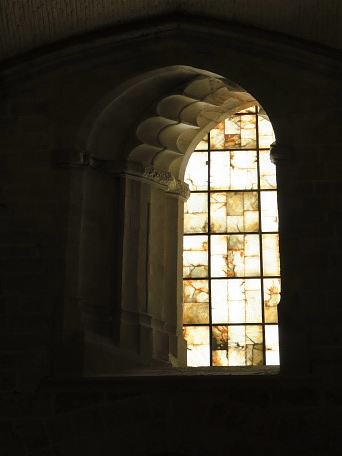
Alabaster window in the Valencia Cathedral. Note the asymmetrical, slanted left side of the wall-frame, which lets sun rays reach the chancel.

The Romans were the first known to use glass for windows, a technology likely first produced in Roman Egypt, in Alexandria c. 100 AD. Presentations of windows can be seen in ancient Egyptian wall art and sculptures from Assyria. Paper windows were economical and widely used in ancient China, Korea, and Japan. In England, glass became common in the windows of ordinary homes only in the early 17th century whereas windows made up of panes of flattened animal horn were used as early as the 14th century. In the 19th century American West, greased paper windows came to be used by pioneering settlers. Modern-style floor-to-ceiling windows became possible only after the industrial plate glass making processes were fully perfected.

=== Technologies ===
In the 13th century BC, the earliest windows were unglazed openings in a roof to admit light during the day. Later, windows were covered with animal hide, cloth, or wood. Shutters that could be opened and closed came next. Over time, windows were built that both protected the inhabitants from the elements and transmitted light, using multiple small pieces of translucent material, such as flattened pieces of translucent animal horn, paper sheets, thin slices of marble (such as fengite), or pieces of glass, set in frameworks of wood, iron or lead. In the Far East, paper was used to fill windows. The Romans were the first known users of glass for windows, exploiting a technology likely first developed in Roman Egypt. Specifically, in Alexandria c. 100 CE, cast-glass windows, albeit with poor optical properties, began to appear, but these were small thick productions, little more than blown-glass jars (cylindrical shapes) flattened out into sheets with circular striation patterns throughout. (Compare traditional church windows made of stained glass.) It would be over a millennium before window glass became transparent enough to see through clearly, as we expect now. However, ancient Roman windows were still very useful, as they presented "an often-overlooked advance in heating technology", by facilitating solar heat to come into a building while stopping warm air from leaving. In 1154, Al-Idrisi described glass windows as a feature of the palace belonging to the king of the Ghana Empire.

Over the centuries techniques were developed to shear through one side of a blown glass cylinder and produce thinner rectangular window panes from the same amount of glass material. This gave rise to tall narrow windows, usually separated by a vertical support called a mullion. Mullioned glass windows were the windows of choice among the European well-to-do, whereas paper windows were economical and widely used in ancient China, Korea, and Japan. In England, glass became common in the windows of ordinary homes only in the early 17th century, whereas windows made up of panes of flattened animal horn were used as early as the 14th century.

Modern-style floor-to-ceiling windows became possible only after the industrial plate glass-making processes were perfected in the late 19th century. Modern windows are usually filled using glass, although transparent plastic is also used.

=== Design trends ===
The introduction of lancet windows into Western European church architecture from the 12th century CE built on a tradition of arched windows inserted between columns, and led not only to tracery and elaborate stained-glass windows but also to a long-standing motif of pointed or rounded window-shapes in ecclesiastical buildings, still seen in many churches today.

Peter Smith discusses overall trends in early-modern rural Welsh window architecture:

Up to about 1680 windows tended to be horizontal in proportion, a shape suitable for lighting the low-ceilinged rooms that had resulted from the insertion of the upper floor into the hall-house. After that date vertically proportioned windows came into fashion, partly at least as a response to the Renaissance taste for the high ceiling. Since 1914 the wheel has come full circle and a horizontally proportioned window is again favoured.

In the 17th century in Europe, window designs had greater height than width, with timber frames being popular and sash windows were introduced. The 18th century saw sash window design changing, with thinner glazing bars and windows becoming a more standardised size. In the 19th century, coloured glass was sometimes used in small margin lights and glazing bars took on a gothic design. Windows became larger and Arts and Crafts and Queen Ann styles were popular, with this continuing into the 20th century.

The spread of plate-glass technology made possible the introduction of picture windows (in Levittown, Pennsylvania, founded 1951–1952).

Many modern day windows may have a window screen or mesh, often made of aluminum or fibreglass, to keep bugs out when the window is opened. Windows are primarily designed to facilitate a vital connection with the outdoors, offering those within the confines of the building visual access to the everchanging events occurring outside. The provision of this connection serves as an integral safeguard for the health and well-being of those inhabiting buildings, lest they experience the detrimental effects of enclosed buildings devoid of windows. Among the myriad criteria for the design of windows, several pivotal criteria have emerged in daylight standards: location, time, weather, nature, and people. Of these criteria, windows that are designed to provide views of nature are considered to be the most important by people.

== Types ==
Parts of a casement cross-window, viewed from the outside

=== Cross ===
A cross-window is a rectangular window usually divided into four lights by a mullion and transom that form a Latin cross.

=== Eyebrow ===
The term eyebrow window is used in two ways: a curved top window in a wall or an eyebrow dormer; and a row of small windows usually under the front eaves such as the James-Lorah House in Pennsylvania.

=== Fixed ===
A fixed window is a window that cannot be opened, whose function is limited to allowing light to enter (unlike an unfixed window, which can open and close). Clerestory windows in church architecture are often fixed. Transom windows may be fixed or operable. This type of window is used in situations where light or vision alone is needed as no ventilation is possible in such windows without the use of trickle vents or overglass vents.

=== Single-hung sash ===
A single-hung sash window is a window that has one sash that is movable (usually the bottom one) and the other fixed. This is the earlier form of sliding sash window and is also cheaper.

=== Double-hung sash ===
A sash window is the traditional style of window in the United Kingdom, and many other places that were formerly colonized by the UK, with two parts (sashes) that overlap slightly and slide up and down inside the frame. The two parts are not necessarily the same size; where the upper sash is smaller (shorter) it is termed a cottage window. Currently, most new double-hung sash windows use spring balances to support the sashes, but traditionally, counterweights held in boxes on either side of the window were used. These were and are attached to the sashes using pulleys of either braided cord or, later, purpose-made chain. Three types of spring balances are called a tape or clock spring balance; channel or block-and-tackle balance, and a spiral or tube balance.

Double-hung sash windows were traditionally often fitted with shutters. Sash windows can be fitted with simplex hinges that let the window be locked into hinges on one side, while the rope on the other side is detached—so the window can be opened for fire escape or cleaning.

=== Foldup ===
Foldup window (inward swinging), cross-section side view

A foldup has two equal sashes similar to a standard double-hung but folds upward allowing air to pass through nearly the full-frame opening. The window is balanced using either springs or counterbalances, similar to a double-hung. The sashes can be either offset to simulate a double-hung, or in-line. The inline versions can be made to fold inward or outward. The inward swinging foldup windows can have fixed screens, while the outward swinging ones require movable screens. The windows are typically used for screen rooms, kitchen pass-throughs, or egress.

=== Horizontal sliding sash ===
A horizontal sliding sash window has two or more sashes that overlap slightly but slide horizontally within the frame. In the UK, these are sometimes called Yorkshire sash windows, presumably because of their traditional use in that county.

=== Casement ===
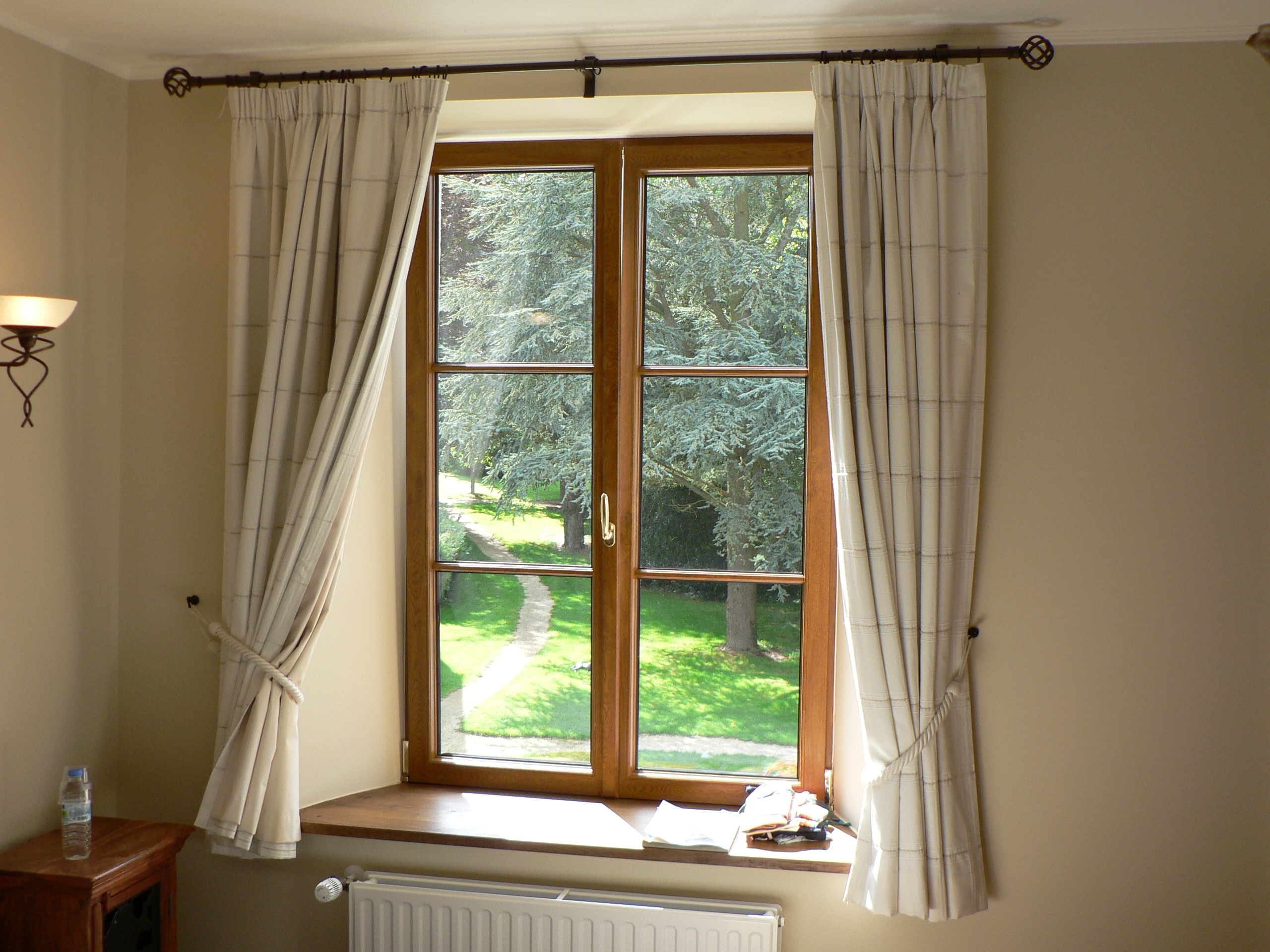
Casement window

A casement window is a window with a hinged sash that swings in or out like a door comprising either a side-hung, top-hung (also called "awning window"; see below), or occasionally bottom-hung sash or a combination of these types, sometimes with fixed panels on one or more sides of the sash. In the US, these are usually opened using a crank, but in parts of Europe, they tend to use projection friction stays and espagnolette locking. Formerly, plain hinges were used with a casement stay. Handing applies to casement windows to determine direction of swing; a casement window may be left-handed, right-handed, or double. The casement window is the dominant type now found in modern buildings in the UK and many other parts of Europe.

=== Awning ===
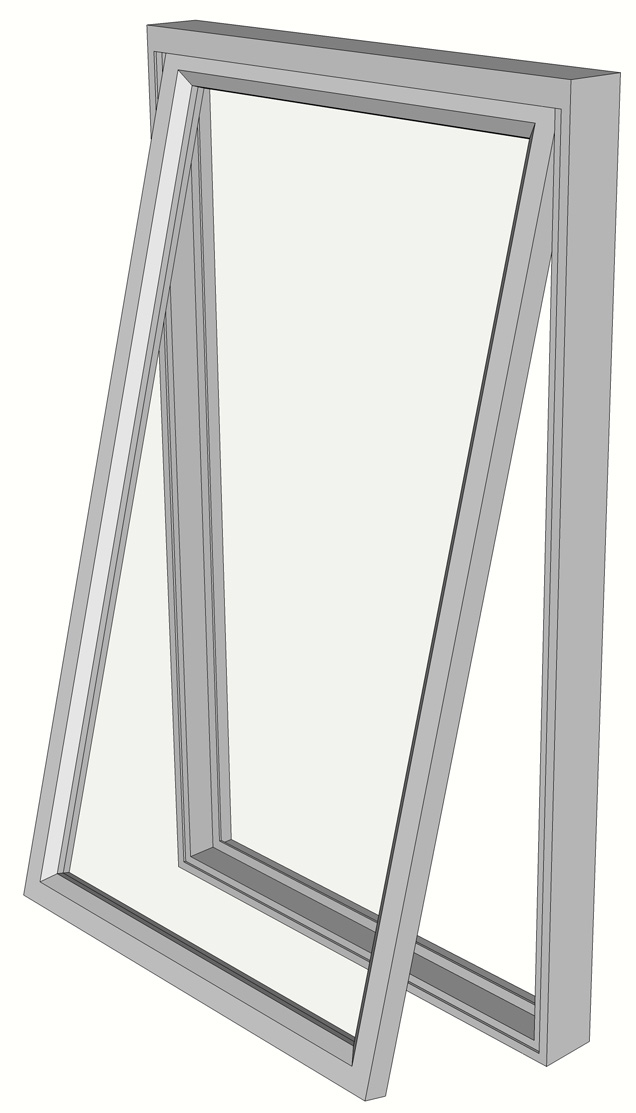
Awning window

An awning window is a casement window that is hung horizontally, hinged on top, so that it swings outward like an awning. In addition to being used independently, they can be stacked, several in one opening, or combined with fixed glass. They are particularly useful for ventilation.

=== Hopper ===
A hopper window is a bottom-pivoting casement window that opens by tilting vertically, typically to the inside, resembling a hopper chute.

=== Pivot ===
A pivot window is a window hung on one hinge on each of two opposite sides which allows the window to revolve when opened. The hinges may be mounted top and bottom (Vertically Pivoted) or at each jamb (Horizontally Pivoted). The window will usually open initially to a restricted position for ventilation and, once released, fully reverse and lock again for safe cleaning from inside. Modern pivot hinges incorporate a friction device to hold the window open against its weight and may have restriction and reversed locking built-in. In the UK, where this type of window is most common, they were extensively installed in high-rise social housing.

=== Tilt and slide ===
A tilt and slide window is a window (more usually a door-sized window) where the sash tilts inwards at the top similar to a hopper window and then slides horizontally behind the fixed pane.

=== Tilt and turn ===
A tilt and turn window can both tilt inwards at the top or open inwards from hinges at the side. This is the most common type of window in Germany, its country of origin. It is also widespread in many other European countries. In Europe, it is usual for these to be of the "turn first" type. i.e. when the handle is turned to 90 degrees the window opens in the side hung mode. With the handle turned to 180 degrees the window opens in bottom hung mode. Most usually in the UK the windows will be "tilt first" i.e. bottom hung at 90 degrees for ventilation and side hung at 180 degrees for cleaning the outer face of the glass from inside the building.

=== Transom ===
A transom window is a window above a door. In an exterior door the transom window is often fixed, in an interior door, it can open either by hinges at top or bottom, or rotate on hinges. It provided ventilation before forced air heating and cooling. A fan-shaped transom is known as a fanlight, especially in the British Isles.

=== Side light ===
Windows beside a door or another window are called sidelights, wing lights, marginal lights, or flanking windows.

=== Jalousie window ===
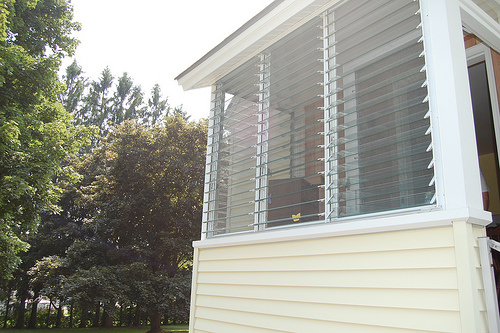
Jalousie or louvered window

Also known as a louvered window, the jalousie window consists of parallel slats of glass or acrylic that open and close like a Venetian blind, usually using a crank or a lever. They are used extensively in tropical architecture. A jalousie door is a door with a jalousie window.

=== Clerestory ===
A clerestory window is a window set in a roof structure or high in a wall, used for daylighting.

=== Skylight ===
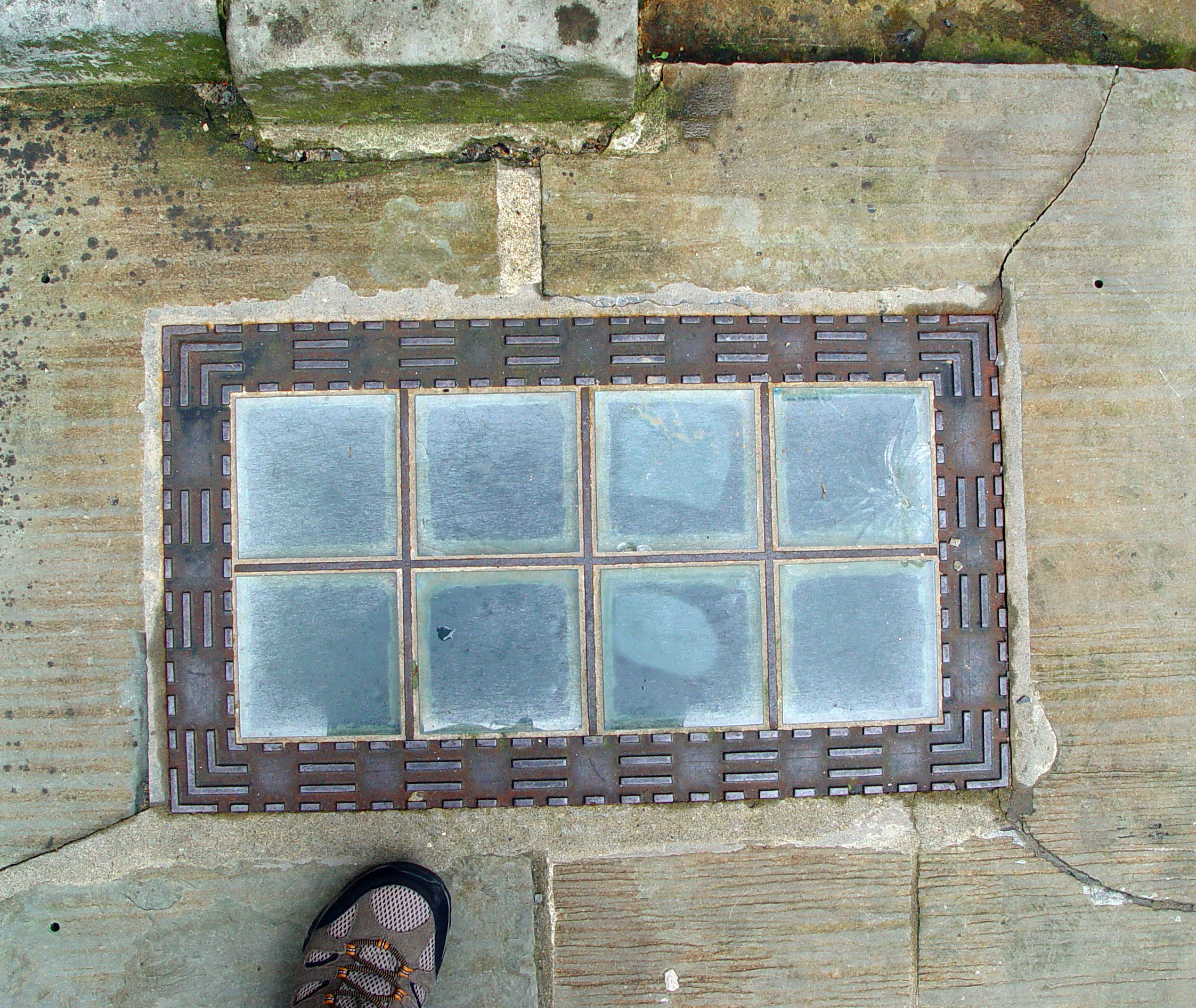
Sidewalk skylight (also named 'pavement light') outside Burlington House, London

A skylight is a window built into a roof structure. This type of window allows for natural daylight and moonlight.

=== Roof ===
A roof window is a sloped window used for daylighting, built into a roof structure. It is one of the few windows that could be used as an exit. Larger roof windows meet building codes for emergency evacuation.

=== Roof lantern ===
A roof lantern is a multi-paned glass structure, resembling a small building, built on a roof for day or moon light. Sometimes includes an additional clerestory. May also be called a cupola.

=== Bay ===
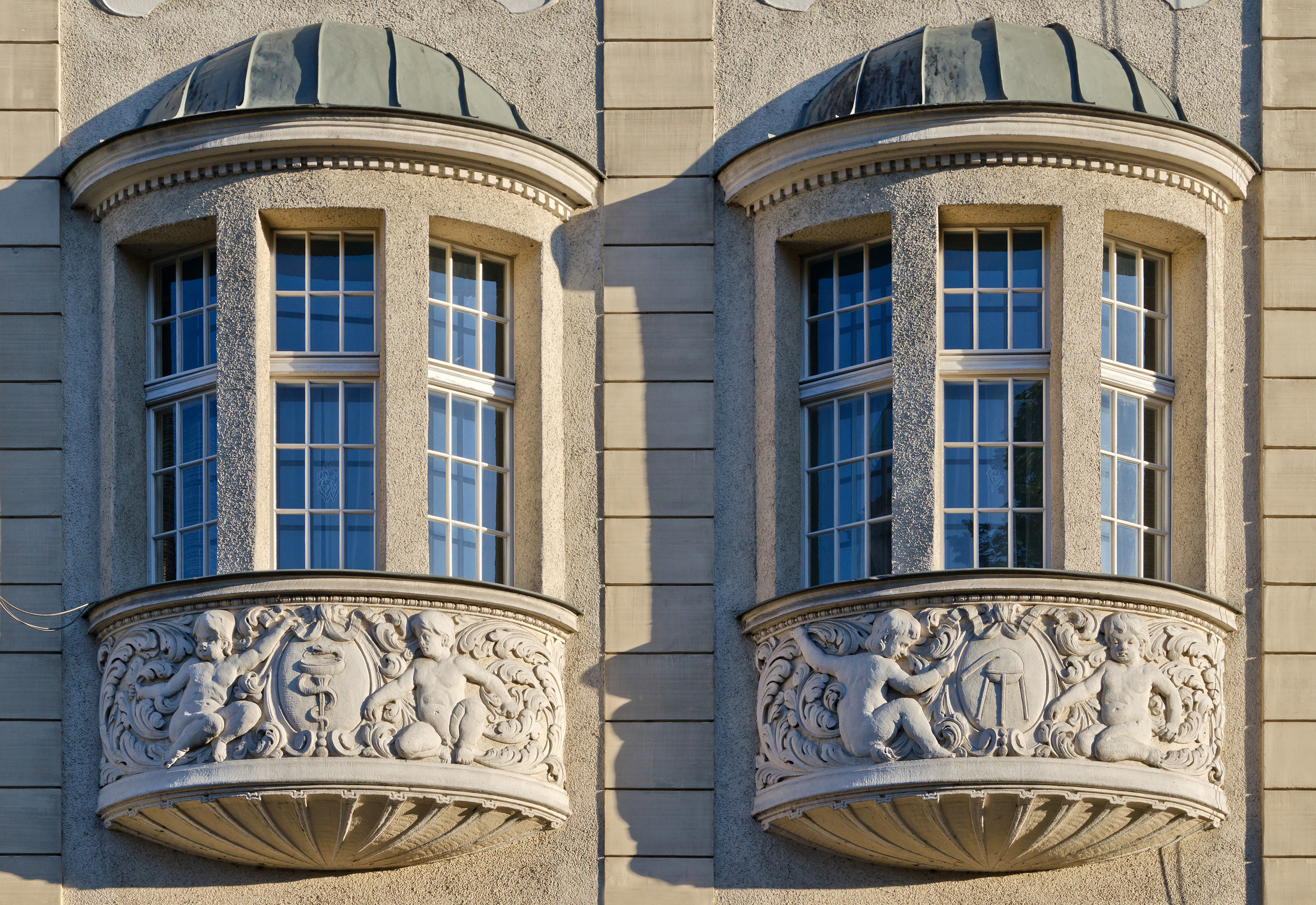
Bay windows in Kłodzko, Poland

A bay window is a multi-panel window, with at least three panels set at different angles to create a protrusion from the wall line.

==== Oriel ====
An oriel window is a form of bay window. This form most often appears in Tudor-style houses and monasteries. It projects from the wall and does not extend to the ground. Originally a form of porch, they are often supported by brackets or corbels.

=== Thermal ===
Thermal or Diocletian windows are large semicircular windows (or niches) which are usually divided into three lights (window compartments) by two mullions. The central compartment is often wider than the two side lights on either side of it.

=== Picture ===
A picture window is a large fixed window in a wall, typically without glazing bars, or glazed with only perfunctory glazing bars (muntins) near the edge of the window. Picture windows provide an unimpeded view, as if framing a picture.

=== Multi-lite ===
A multi-lite window is a window glazed with small panes of glass separated by wooden or lead glazing bars, or muntins, arranged in a decorative glazing pattern often dictated by the building's architectural style. Due to the historic unavailability of large panes of glass, the multi-lit (or lattice window) was the most common window style until the beginning of the 20th century, and is still used in traditional architecture.

=== Emergency exit/egress ===
An emergency exit window is a window big enough and low enough so that occupants can escape through the opening in an emergency, such as a fire. In many countries, exact specifications for emergency windows in bedrooms are given in many building codes. Specifications for such windows may also allow for the entrance of emergency rescuers. Vehicles, such as buses, aircraft, and trains frequently have emergency exit windows as well.

=== Stained glass ===
A stained glass window is a window composed of pieces of colored glass, transparent, translucent or opaque, frequently portraying persons or scenes. Typically the glass in these windows is separated by lead glazing bars. Stained glass windows were popular in Victorian houses and some Wrightian houses, and are especially common in churches.

=== French ===
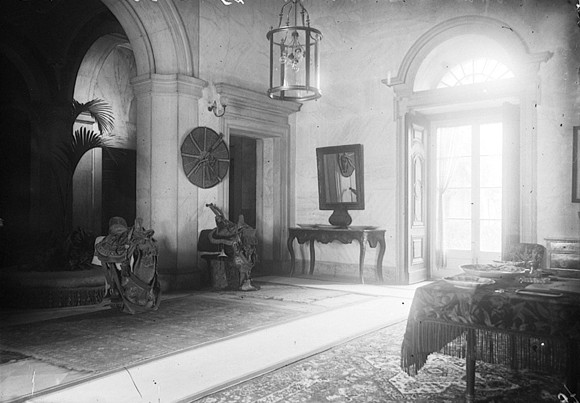
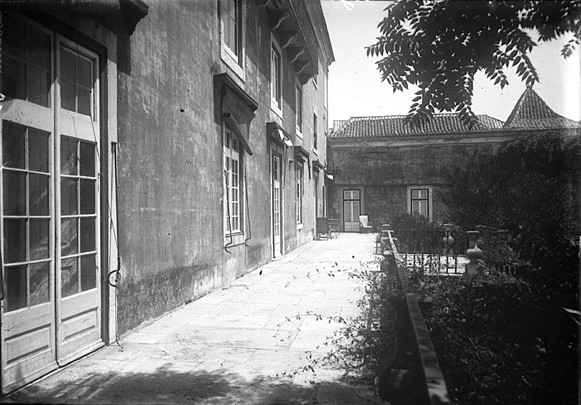
A "French window" (two French doors on an exterior wall hinged to open outward together without a mullion separating them) at the Embassy of France in Lisbon, early 20th century

A French door is a door with glass panes extending the full length. A pair of these that open in the middle are variously called French doors, a French window, or French windows; they are usually placed on an exterior wall. French windows are known as porte-fenêtre in France and portafinestra in Italy, and are frequently used in modern houses.

=== Double-paned ===
Double-paned or double-glazed windows have two parallel panes (slabs of glass) with a separation of typically about 1 cm; this space is permanently sealed and filled at the time of manufacture with dry air or other dry nonreactive gas. Such windows provide a marked improvement in thermal insulation (and usually in acoustic insulation as well) and are resistant to fogging and frosting caused by temperature differential. They are widely used for residential and commercial construction in intemperate climates. In the UK, double-paned and triple-paned are referred to as double-glazing and triple-glazing. Triple-paned windows are now a common type of glazing in central to northern Europe. Quadruple glazing is now being introduced in Scandinavia.

=== Hexagonal window ===
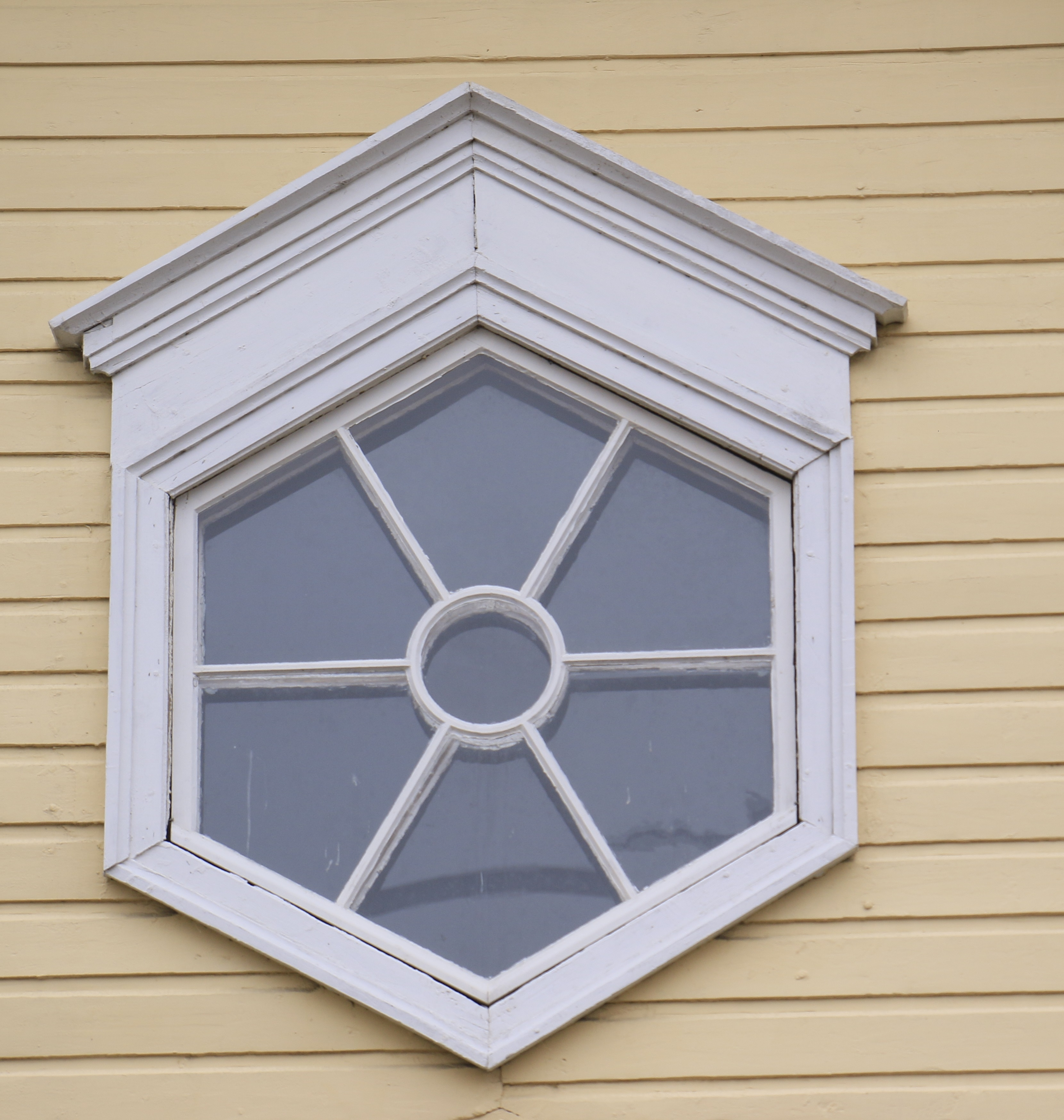
Hexagonal window

A hexagonal window is a hexagon-shaped window, resembling a bee cell or crystal lattice of graphite. The window can be vertically or horizontally oriented, openable or dead. It can also be regular or elongately-shaped and can have a separator (mullion). Typically, the cellular window is used for an attic or as a decorative feature, but it can also be a major architectural element to provide the natural lighting inside buildings.

=== Guillotine window ===
A guillotine window is a window that opens vertically. Guillotine windows have more than one sliding frame, and open from bottom to top or top to bottom.

== Terms ==
EN 12519 is the European standard that describes windows terms officially used in EU Member States. The main terms are:

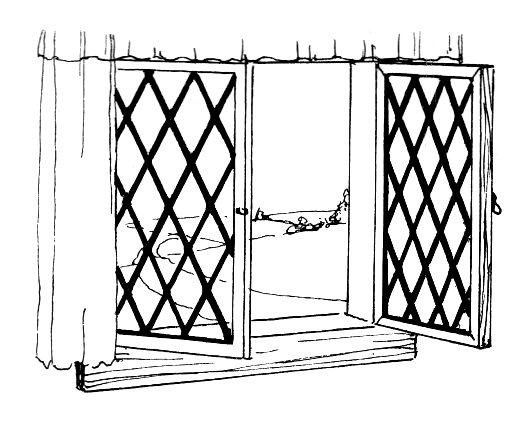
Casement window, with latticed lights

- Light, or Lite, is the area between the outer parts of a window (transom, sill and jambs), usually filled with a glass pane. Multiple panes are divided by mullions when load-bearing, muntins when not.
- Lattice light is a compound window pane made up of small pieces of glass held together in a lattice.
- Fixed window is a unit of one non-moving lite. The terms single-light, double-light, etc., refer to the number of these glass panes in a window.
- Sash unit is a window consisting of at least one sliding glass component, typically composed of two lites (known as a double-light).
- Replacement window in the United States means a framed window designed to slip inside the original window frame from the inside after the old sashes are removed. In Europe, it usually means a complete window including a replacement outer frame.
- New construction window, in the US, means a window with a nailing fin that is inserted into a rough opening from the outside before applying siding and inside trim. A nailing fin is a projection on the outer frame of the window in the same plane as the glazing, which overlaps the prepared opening, and can thus be 'nailed' into place. In the UK and mainland Europe, windows in new-build houses are usually fixed with long screws into expanding plastic plugs in the brickwork. A gap of up to 13 mm is left around all four sides, and filled with expanding polyurethane foam. This makes the window fixing weatherproof but allows for expansion due to heat.
- Lintel is a beam over the top of a window, also known as a transom.
- Window sill is the bottom piece in a window frame. Window sills slant outward to drain water away from the inside of the building.
- Secondary glazing is an additional frame applied to the inside of an existing frame, usually used on protected or listed buildings to achieve higher levels of thermal and sound insulation without compromising the look of the building.
- Decorative millwork is the moulding, cornices and lintels often decorating the surrounding edges of the window.

=== Labeling ===
The United States NFRC Window Label lists the following terms:

- Thermal transmittance (U-factor), best values are around U-0.15 (equal to 0.8 W/m2/K)
- Solar heat gain coefficient (SHGC), ratio of solar heat (infrared) passing through the glass to incident solar heat
- Visible transmittance (VT), ratio of transmitted visible light divided by incident visible light
- Air leakage (AL), measured in cubic feet per minute per linear foot of crack between sash and frame
- Condensation resistance (CR), measured between 1 and 100 (the higher the number, the higher the resistance of the formation of condensation)

The European harmonised standard hEN 14351–1, which deals with doors and windows, defines 23 characteristics (divided into essential and non essential). Two other, preliminary European Norms that are under development deal with internal pedestrian doors (prEN 14351–2), smoke and fire resisting doors, and openable windows (prEN 16034).

== Construction ==
Examples of modern plastic and wooden window profiles with insulated glazing

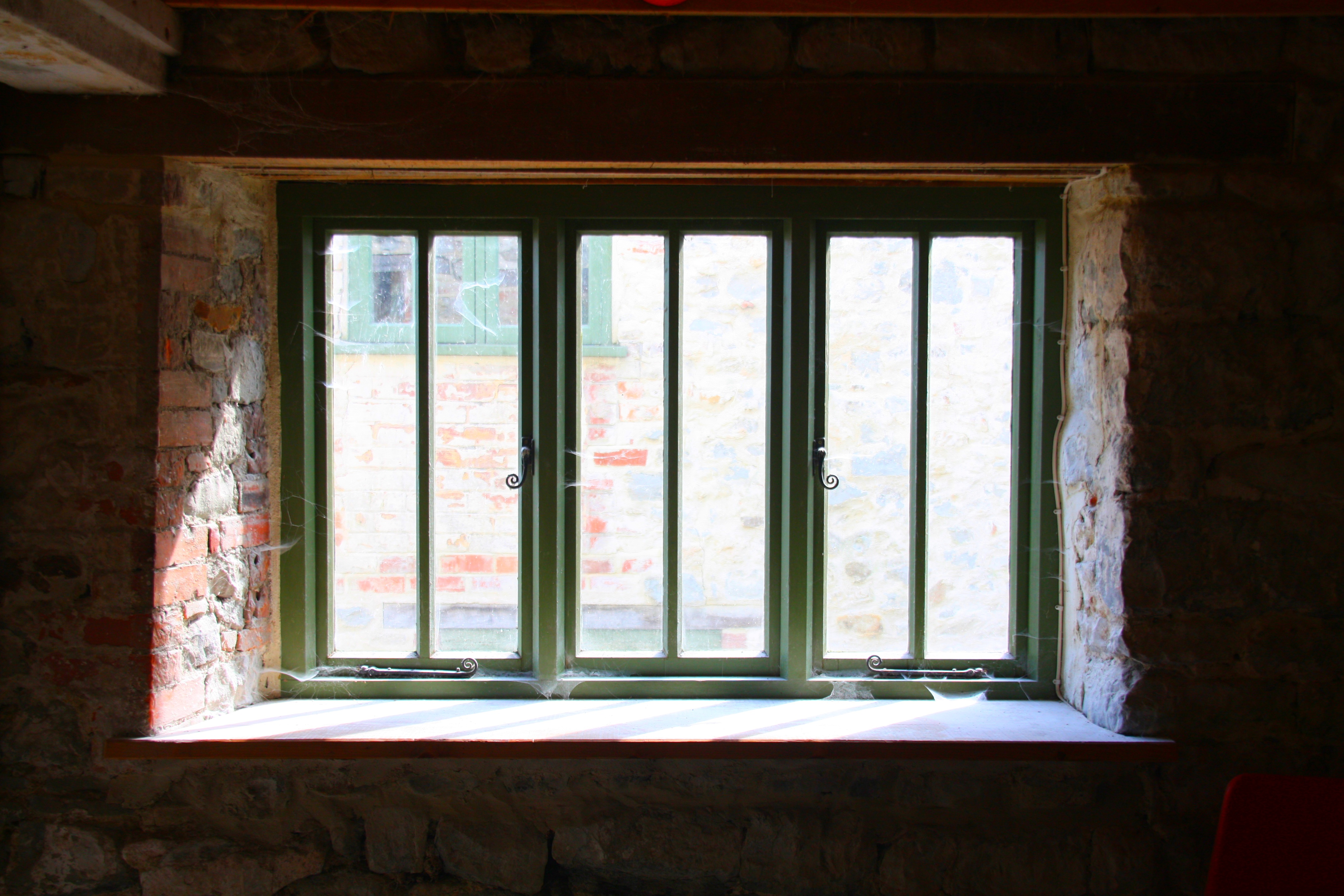
Modern wooden framed window fitted in the 14th century Lyme Regis watermill, UK

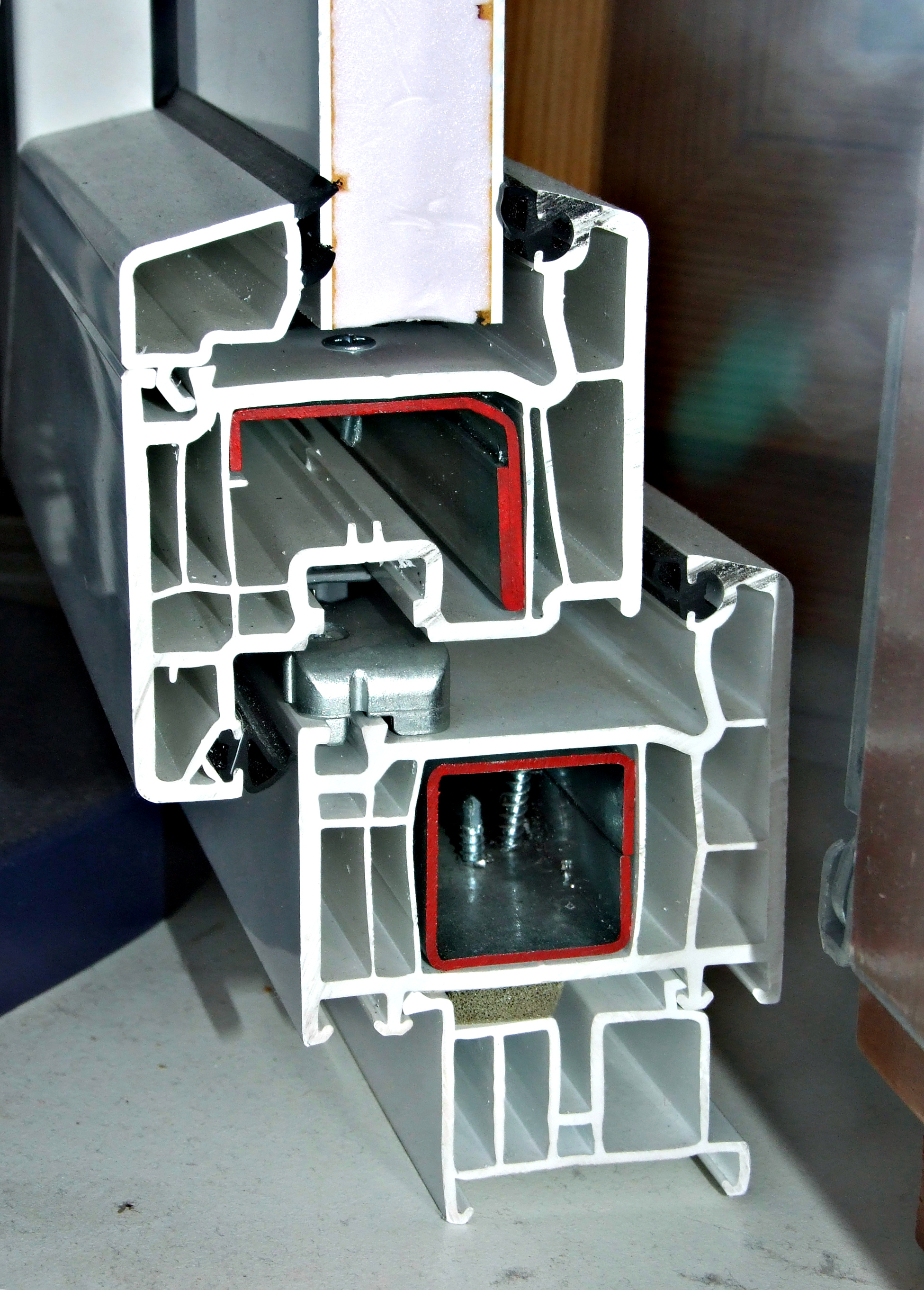
5-chamber plastic window profile

Windows can be a significant source of heat transfer. Therefore, insulated glazing units consist of two or more panes to reduce the transfer of heat.

=== Grids or muntins ===
These are the pieces of framing that separate a larger window into smaller panes. In older windows, large panes of glass were quite expensive, so muntins allowed smaller panes to fill a larger space. In modern windows, light-colored muntins still provide a useful function by reflecting some of the light going through the window, making the window itself a source of diffuse light (instead of just the surfaces and objects illuminated within the room). By increasing the indirect illumination of surfaces near the window, muntins tend to brighten the area immediately around a window and reduce the contrast of shadows within the room.

=== Frame and sash construction ===
Frames and sashes can be made of the following materials:

Material	Thermal resistance	Durability	Maintenance	Cost	Recycled content	Comment
Wood	very good	variable	low	average	high	a well-maintained wood window built before 1950 can last 50–100 years
uPVC ("vinyl")	very good	very good (Note: PVC and fiberglass frames perform well in accelerated weathering tests. Because PVC is not as strong as other materials, some PVC frames are reinforced with metal or composite materials to improve their structural strength.)	very low	average	very low	has a life span of 25–50 years on average
Aluminum	very good (Note: Modern aluminium window frames are typically separated by a thermal break made of a glass fibre reinforced polyamide. With a 34 mm thermal insulation profile it is possible to reach Uf= 1.3 W/m2K for a metal window. This greatly increases thermal resistance, while retaining virtually all of the structural strength.)	good	very low	low	typically > 95%	mostly thermally broken by a thermal insulation profile
Composites	very good	good	very low	high	high	used in modern buildings
Steel	medium	superior	very low	high	> 98%	typically welded at corner joints
Fiberglass	very good	very good	very low	high	medium	

Composites (also known as Hybrid Windows) are start since early 1998 and combine materials like aluminium + pvc or wood to obtain aesthetics of one material with the functional benefits of another.

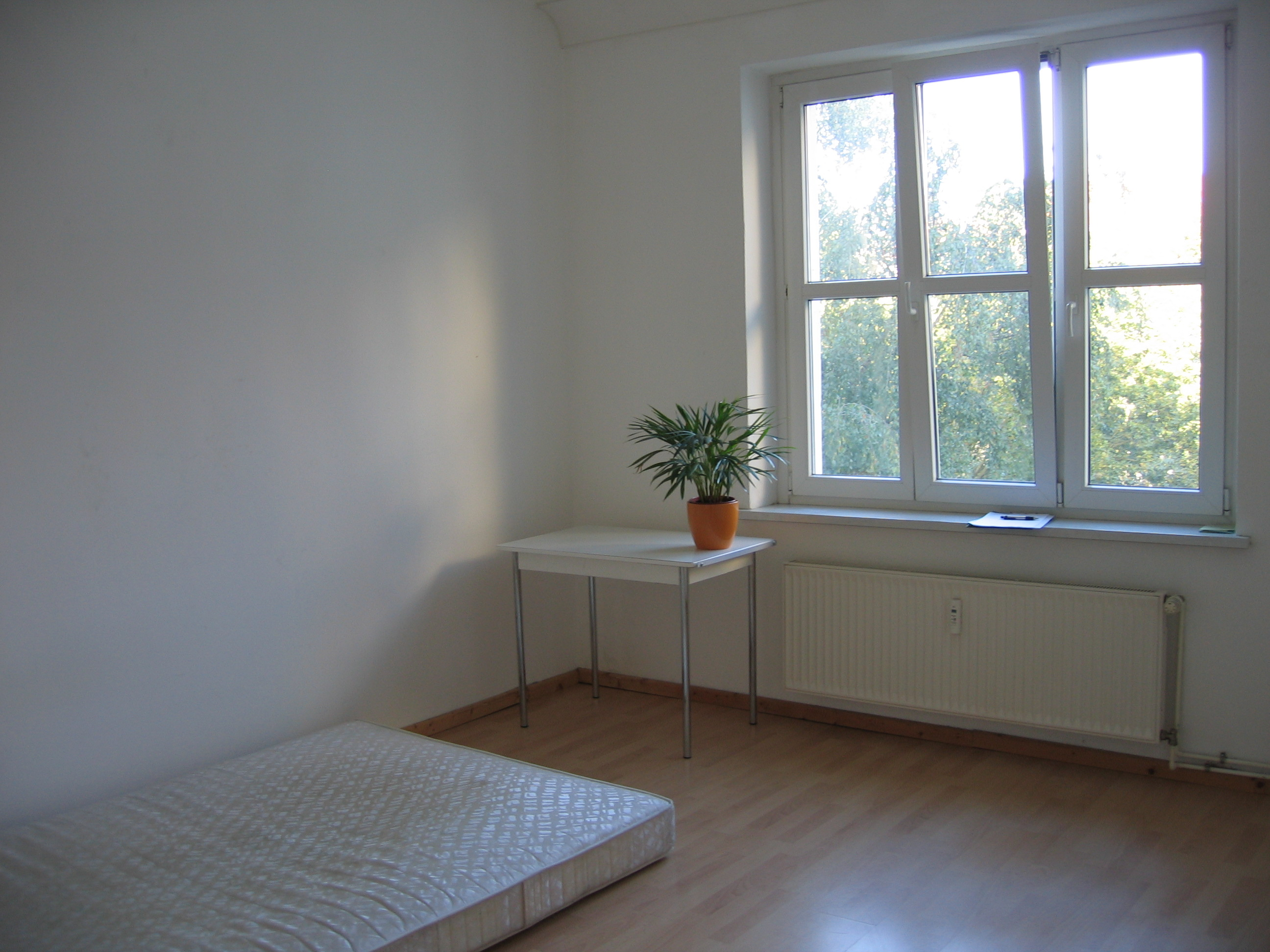
A typical installation of insulated glazing windows with uPVC window frames

A special class of PVC window frames, uPVC window frames, became widespread since the late 20th century, particularly in Europe: there were 83.5 million installed by 1998 with numbers still growing as of 2012.

=== Glazing and filling ===
Low-emissivity coated panes reduce heat transfer by radiation, which, depending on which surface is coated, helps prevent heat loss (in cold climates) or heat gains (in warm climates).

High thermal resistance can be obtained by evacuating or filling the insulated glazing units with gases such as argon or krypton, which reduces conductive heat transfer due to their low thermal conductivity. Performance of such units depends on good window seals and meticulous frame construction to prevent entry of air and loss of efficiency.

Modern double-pane and triple-pane windows often include one or more low-e coatings to reduce the window's U-factor (its insulation value, specifically its rate of heat loss). In general, soft-coat low-e coatings tend to result in a lower solar heat gain coefficient (SHGC) than hard-coat low-e coatings.

Modern windows are usually glazed with one large sheet of glass per sash, while windows in the past were glazed with multiple panes separated by glazing bars, or muntins, due to the unavailability of large sheets of glass. Today, glazing bars tend to be decorative, separating windows into small panes of glass even though larger panes of glass are available, generally in a pattern dictated by the architectural style at use. Glazing bars are typically wooden, but occasionally lead glazing bars soldered in place are used for more intricate glazing patterns.

=== Other construction details ===
Many windows have movable window coverings such as blinds or curtains to keep out light, provide additional insulation, or ensure privacy. Windows allow natural light to enter, but too much can have negative effects such as glare and heat gain. Additionally, while windows let the user see outside, there must be a way to maintain privacy within the building. Window coverings are practical accommodations for these issues.

== Impact of the sun ==
=== Sun incidence angle ===
Historically, windows are designed with surfaces parallel to vertical building walls. Such a design allows considerable solar light and heat penetration due to the most commonly occurring incidence of sun angles. In passive solar building design, an extended eave is typically used to control the amount of solar light and heat entering the window(s).

An alternative method is to calculate an optimum window mounting angle that accounts for summer sun load minimization, with consideration of actual latitude of the building. This process has been implemented, for example, in the Dakin Building in Brisbane, California—in which most of the fenestration is designed to reflect summer heat load and help prevent summer interior over-illumination and glare, by canting windows to nearly a 45 degree angle.

=== Solar window ===
Photovoltaic windows not only provide a clear view and illuminate rooms, but also convert sunlight to electricity for the building. In most cases, translucent photovoltaic cells are used.

=== Passive solar ===
Passive solar windows allow light and solar energy into a building while minimizing air leakage and heat loss. Properly positioning these windows in relation to sun, wind, and landscape—while properly shading them to limit excess heat gain in summer and shoulder seasons, and providing thermal mass to absorb energy during the day and release it when temperatures cool at night—increases comfort and energy efficiency. Properly designed in climates with adequate solar gain, these can even be a building's primary heating system.

=== Coverings ===
A window covering is a shade or screen that provides multiple functions. Some coverings, such as drapes and blinds, provide occupants with privacy. Some window coverings control solar heat gain and glare. There are external shading devices and internal shading devices. Low-e window film is a low-cost alternative to window replacement to transform existing poorly-insulating windows into energy-efficient windows. For high-rise buildings, smart glass can provide an alternative.

=== Gallery ===
Various windows

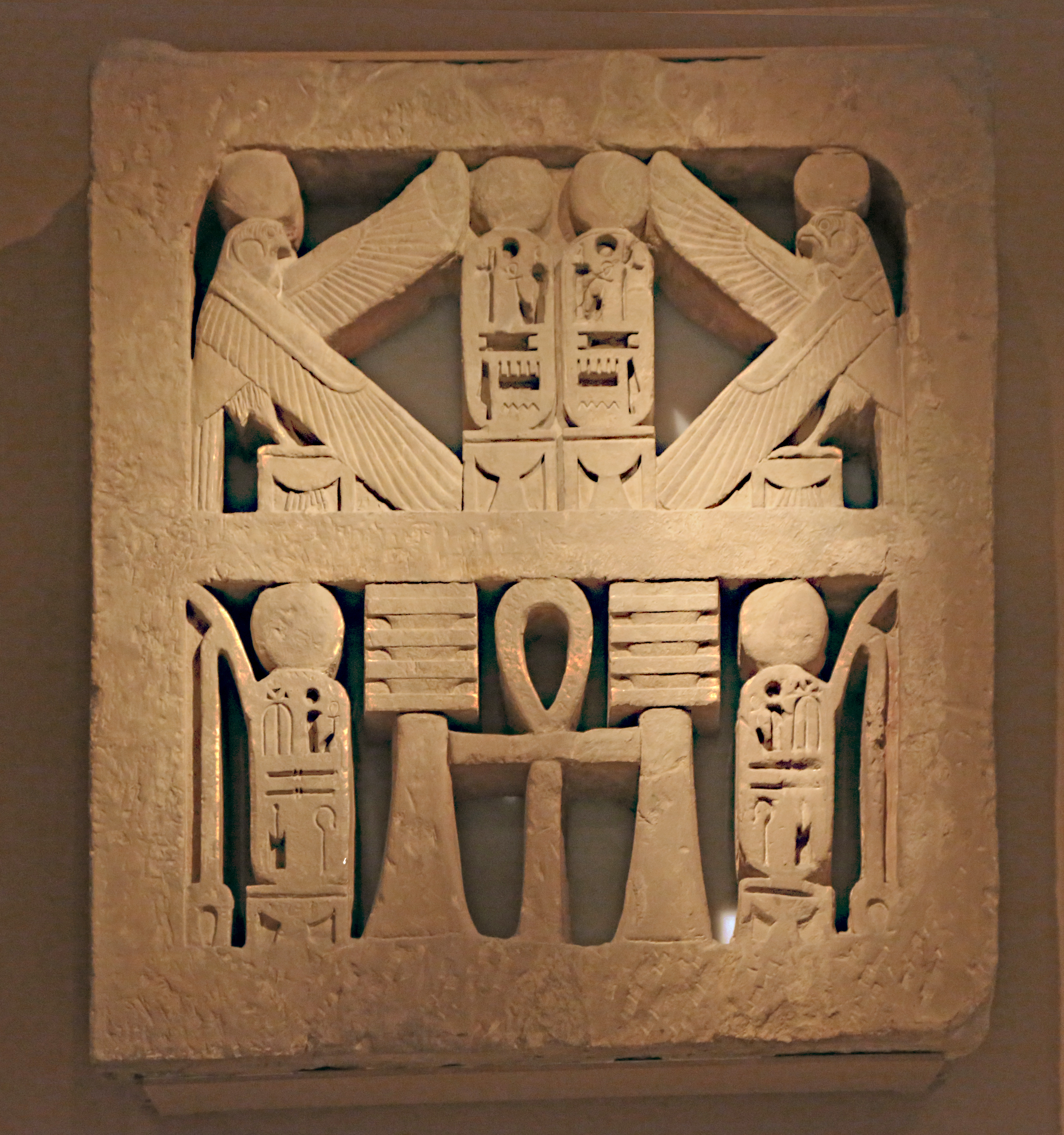
Ancient Egyptian sandstone window grill from a palace of Ramesses III, now in the Metropolitan Museum of Art (New York City)

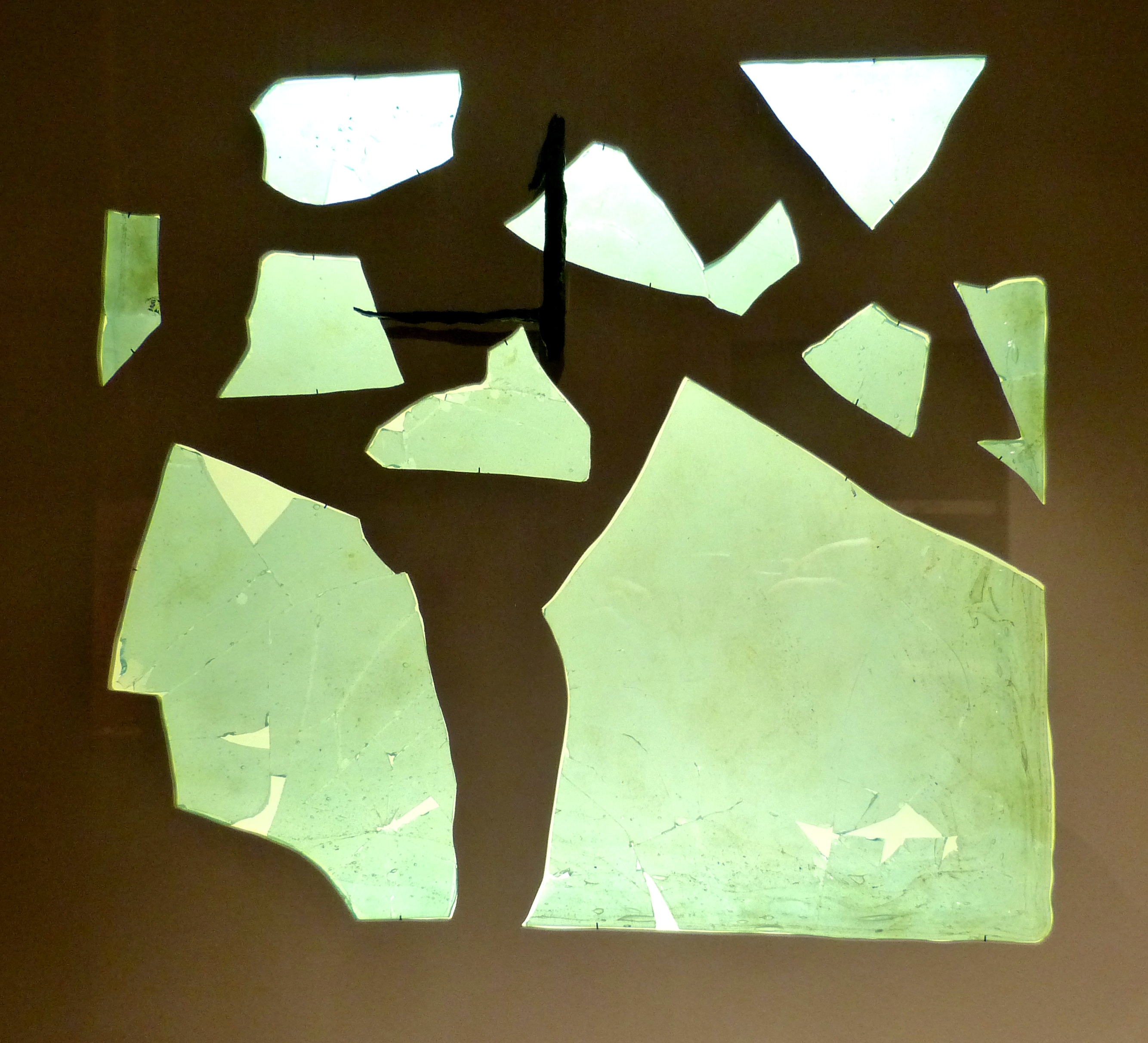
Fragment of a Roman window glass plate dated to 1st to 4th century CE. Note the obvious curvature; this is not a flat pane

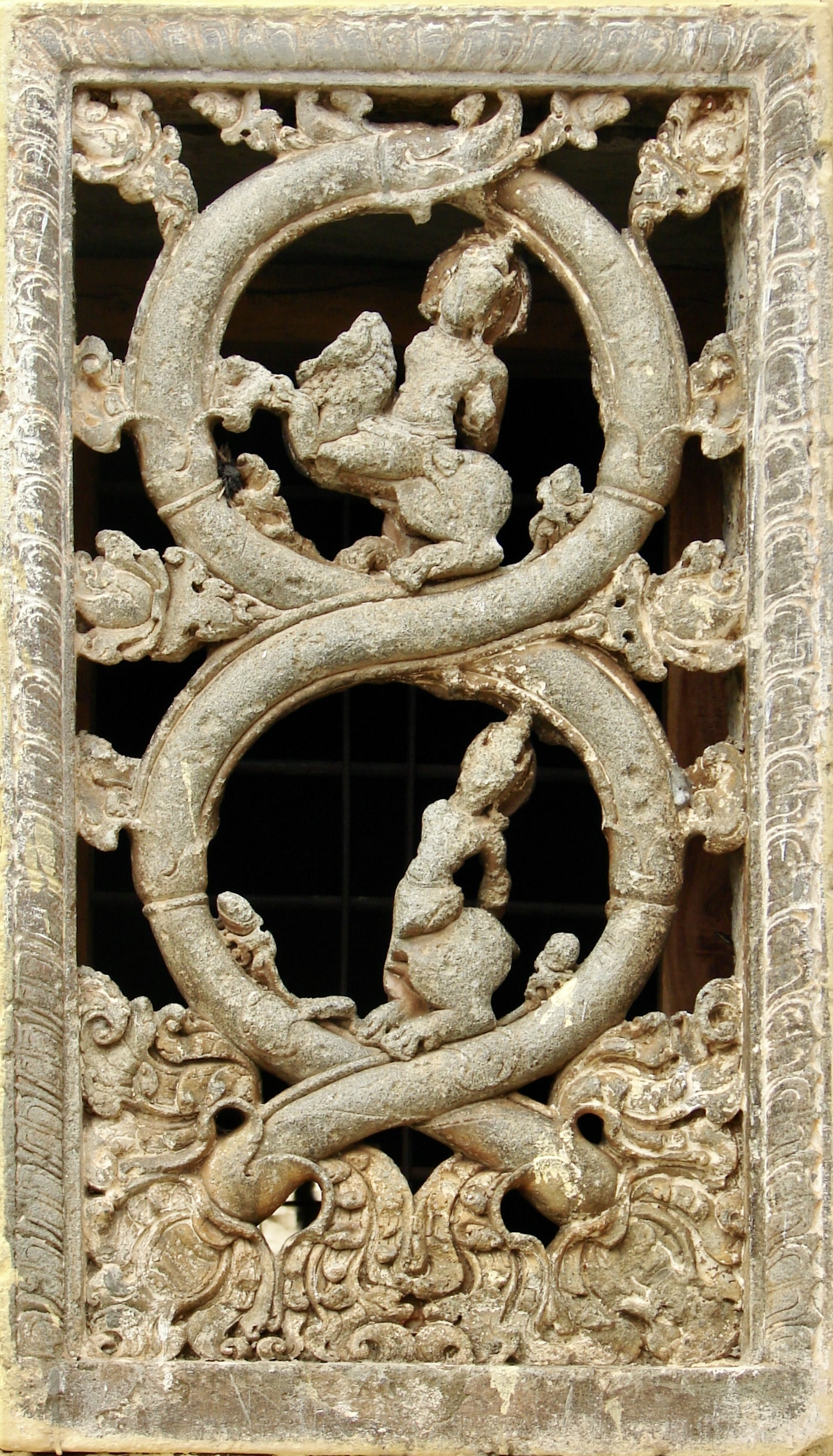
Indian window of the Kalleshvara Temple (India)

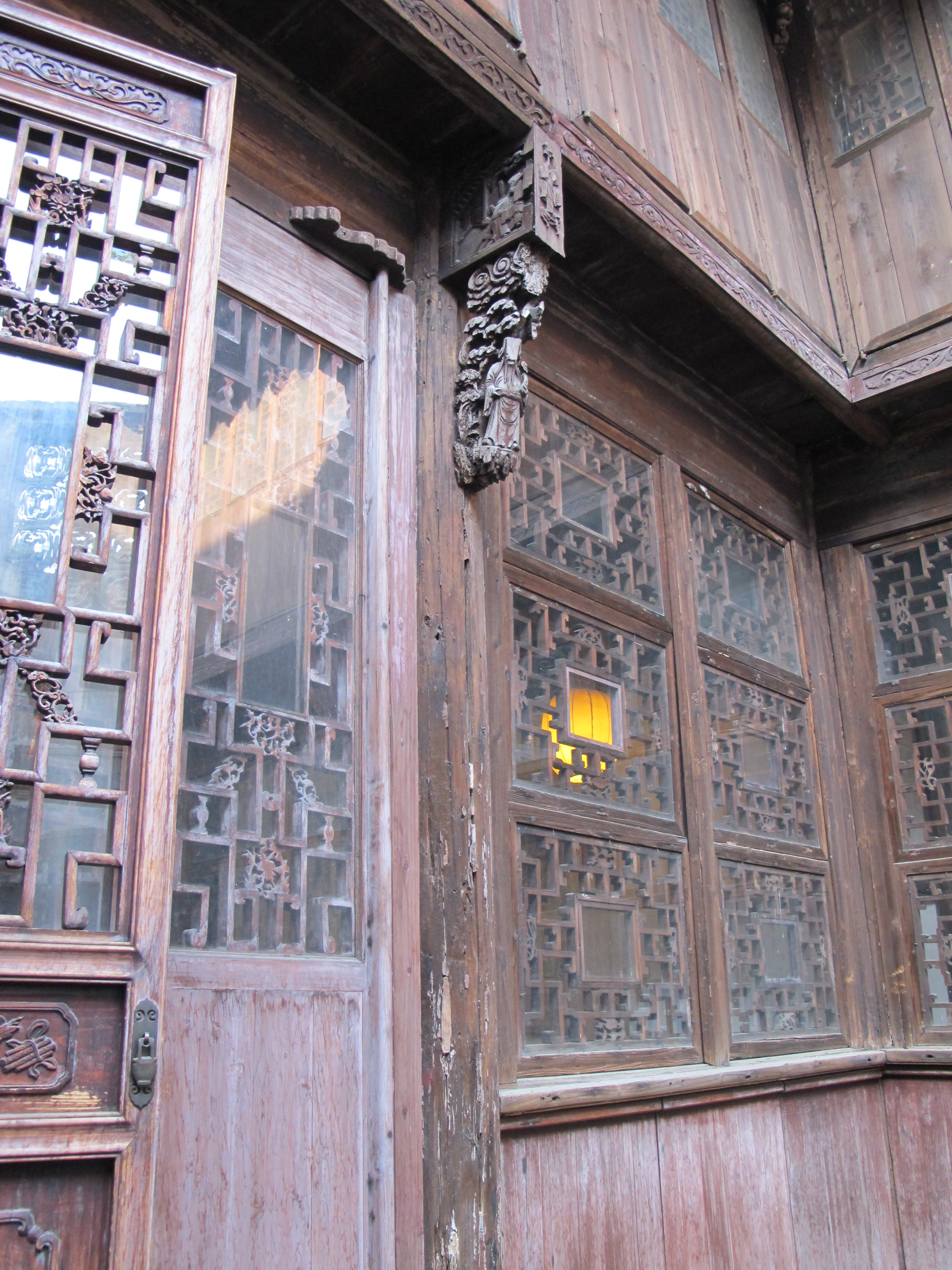
Chinese latticed window in Zhenze (Jiangsu, China)

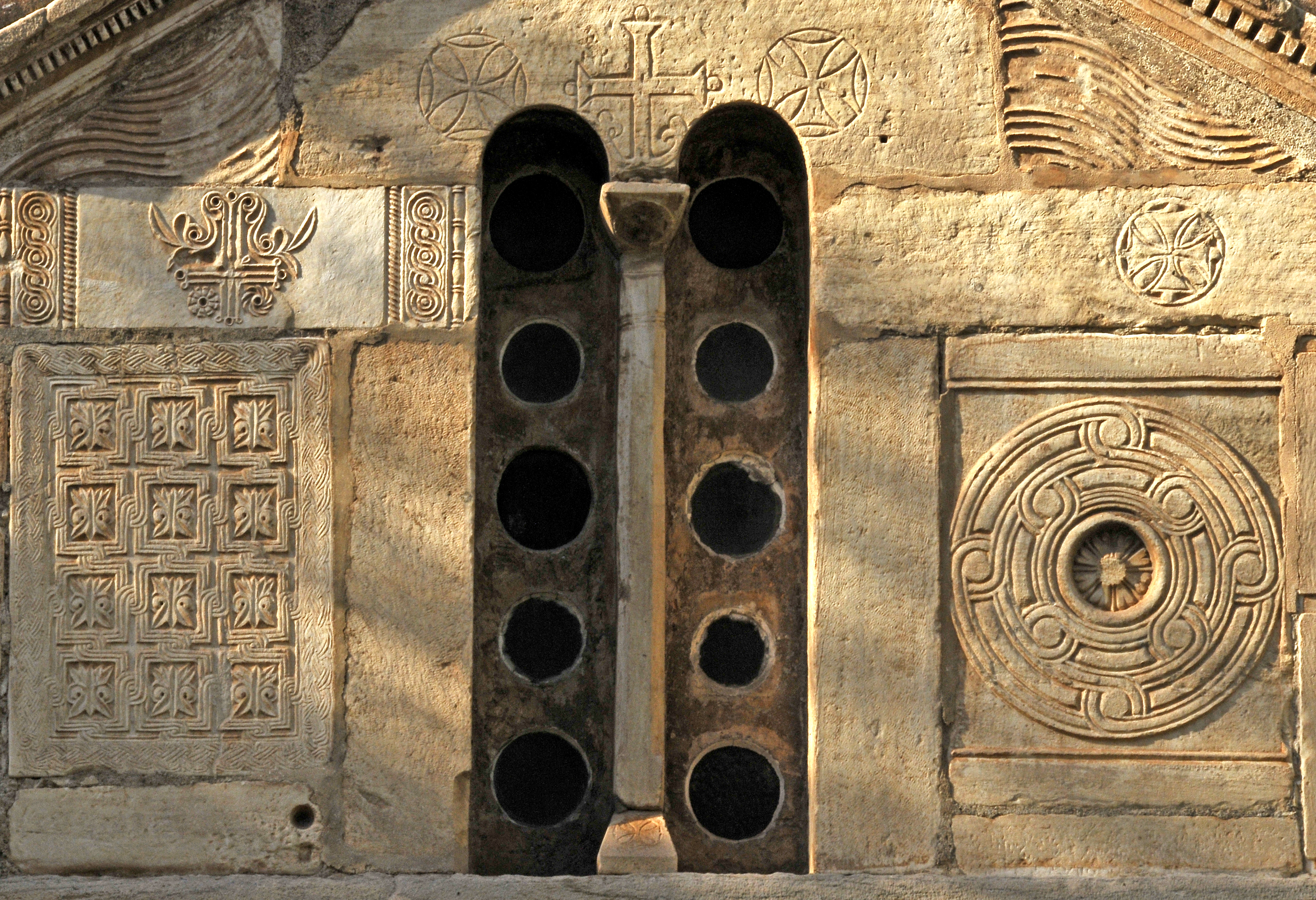
Byzantine window of the Little Metropolis (Athens, Greece)

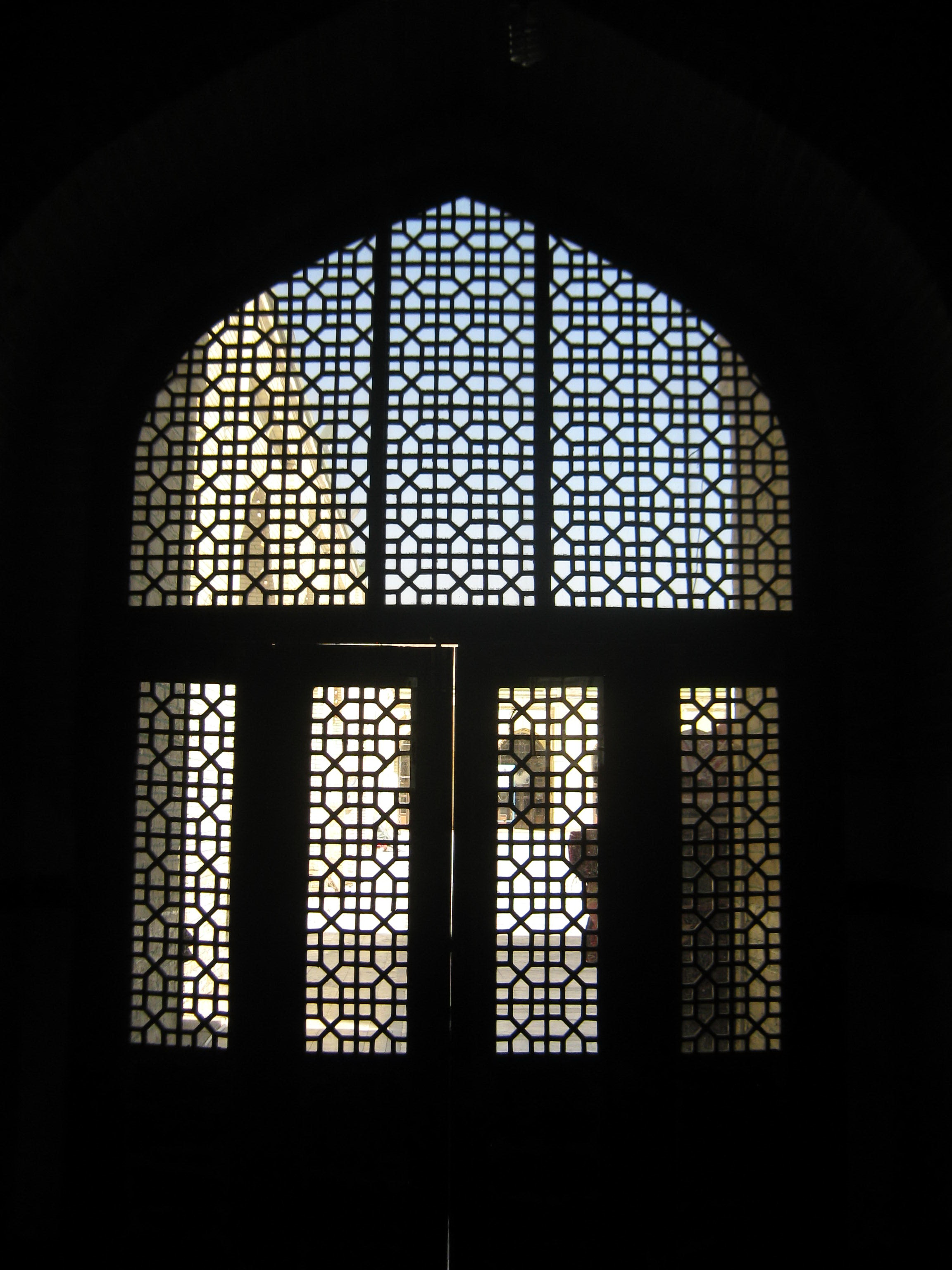
Islamic window of the Jameh Mosque of Nishapur (Nishapur, Iran)

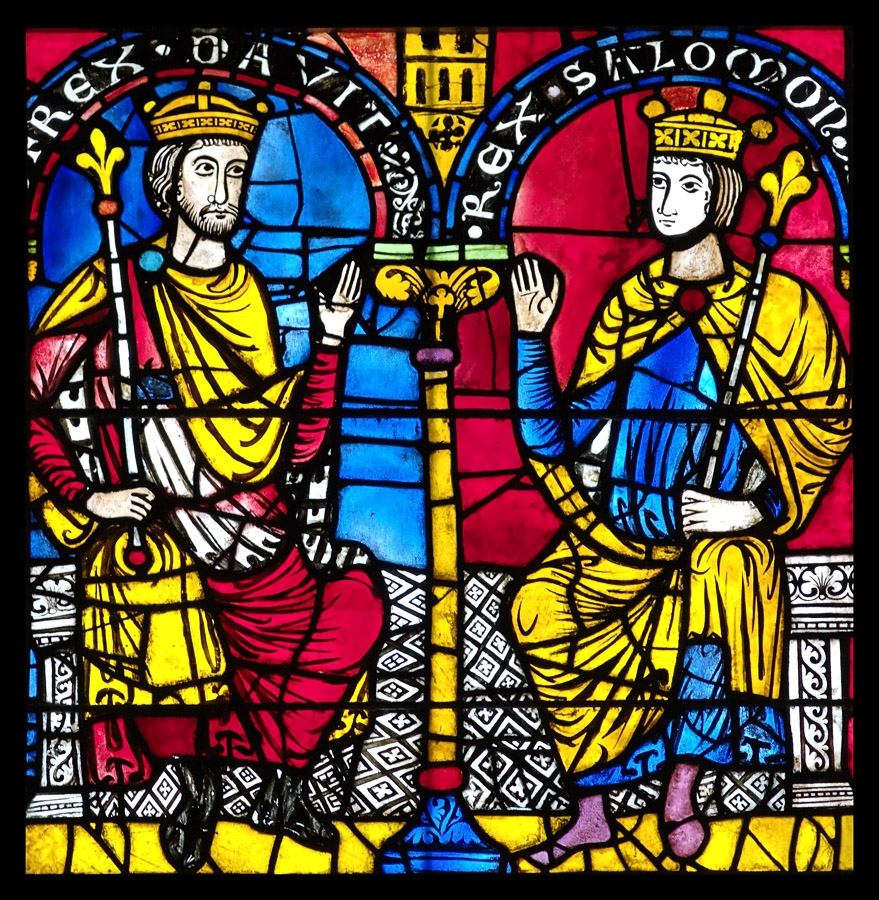
Part of a Romanesque stained glass window with Kings David and Solomon from Cathédrale Notre-Dame de Strasbourg (Strasbourg, France)

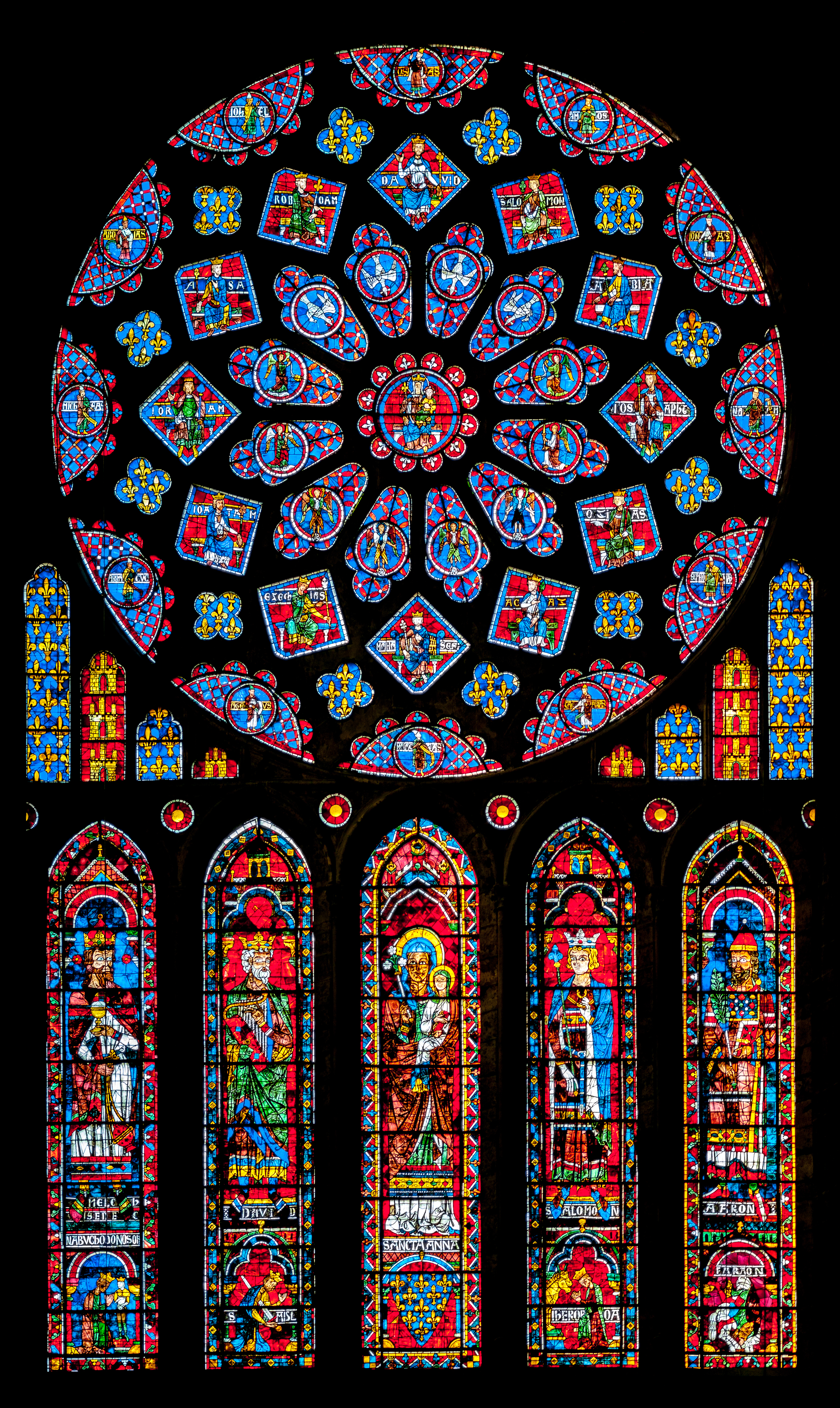
North transept windows in the Chartres Cathedral (Chartres, France)

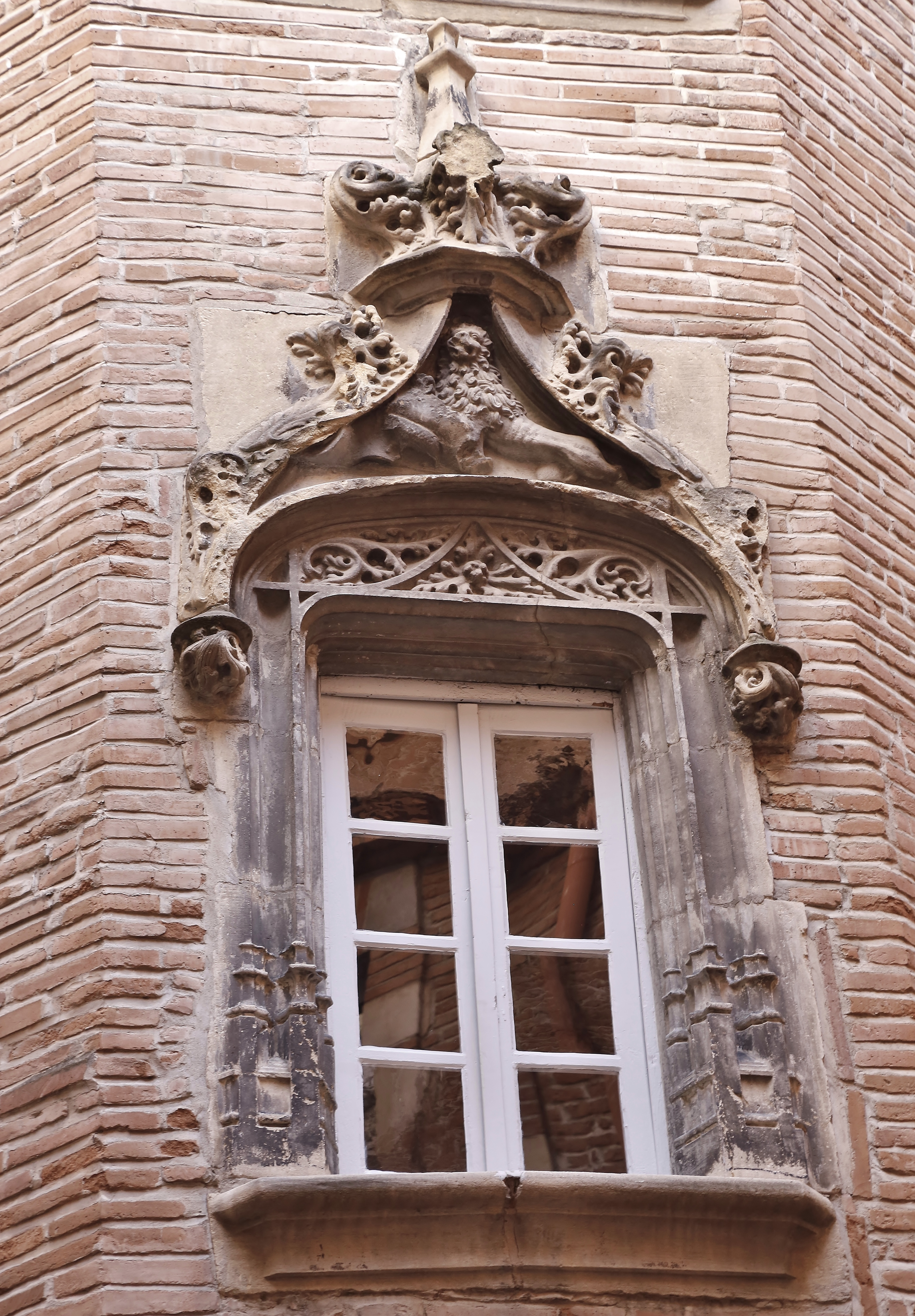
Flamboyant Gothic window of a stair tower (Toulouse, France)

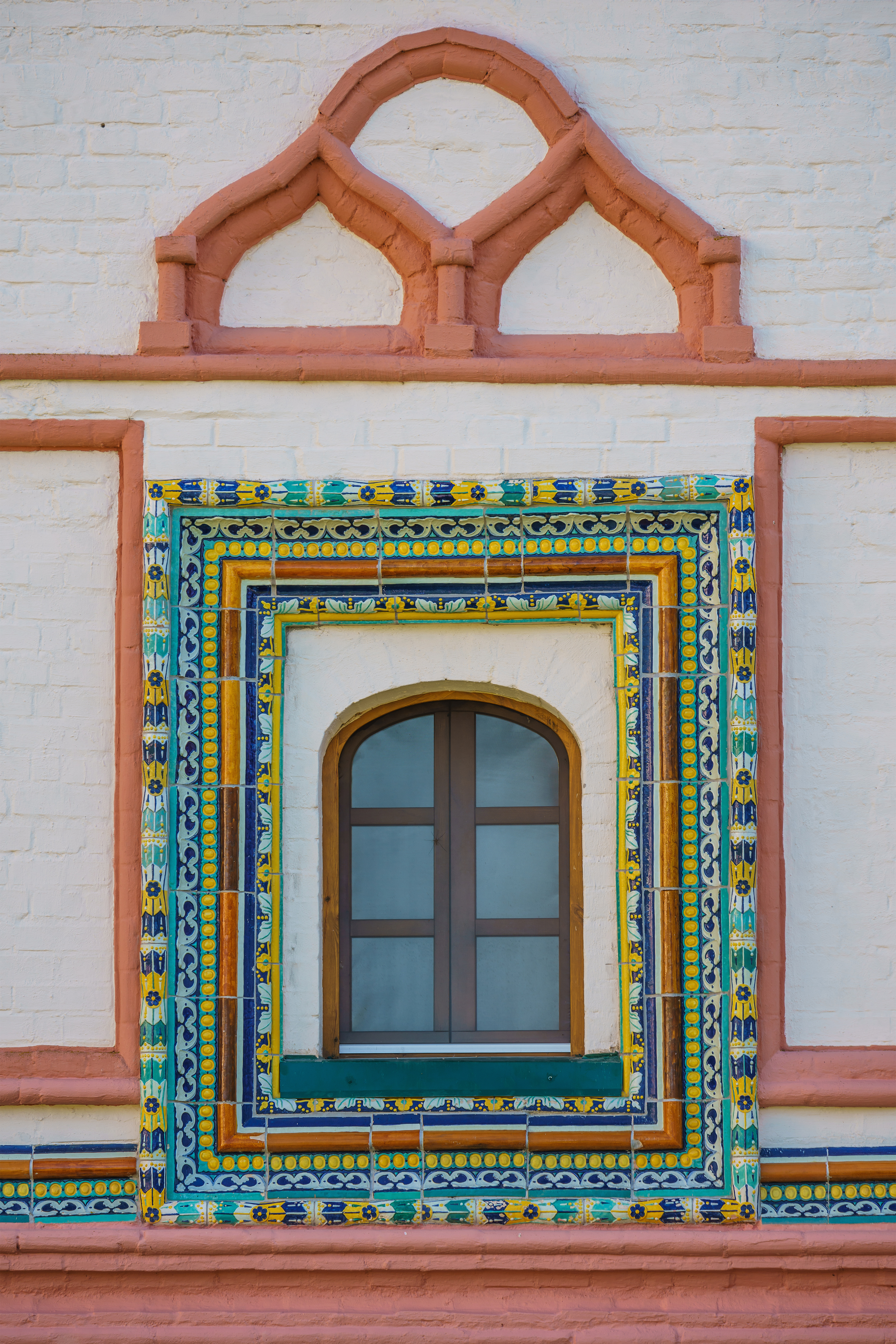
Russian window of the Valday Iversky Monastery (Lake Valdayskoye, Novgorod Oblast, Russia)

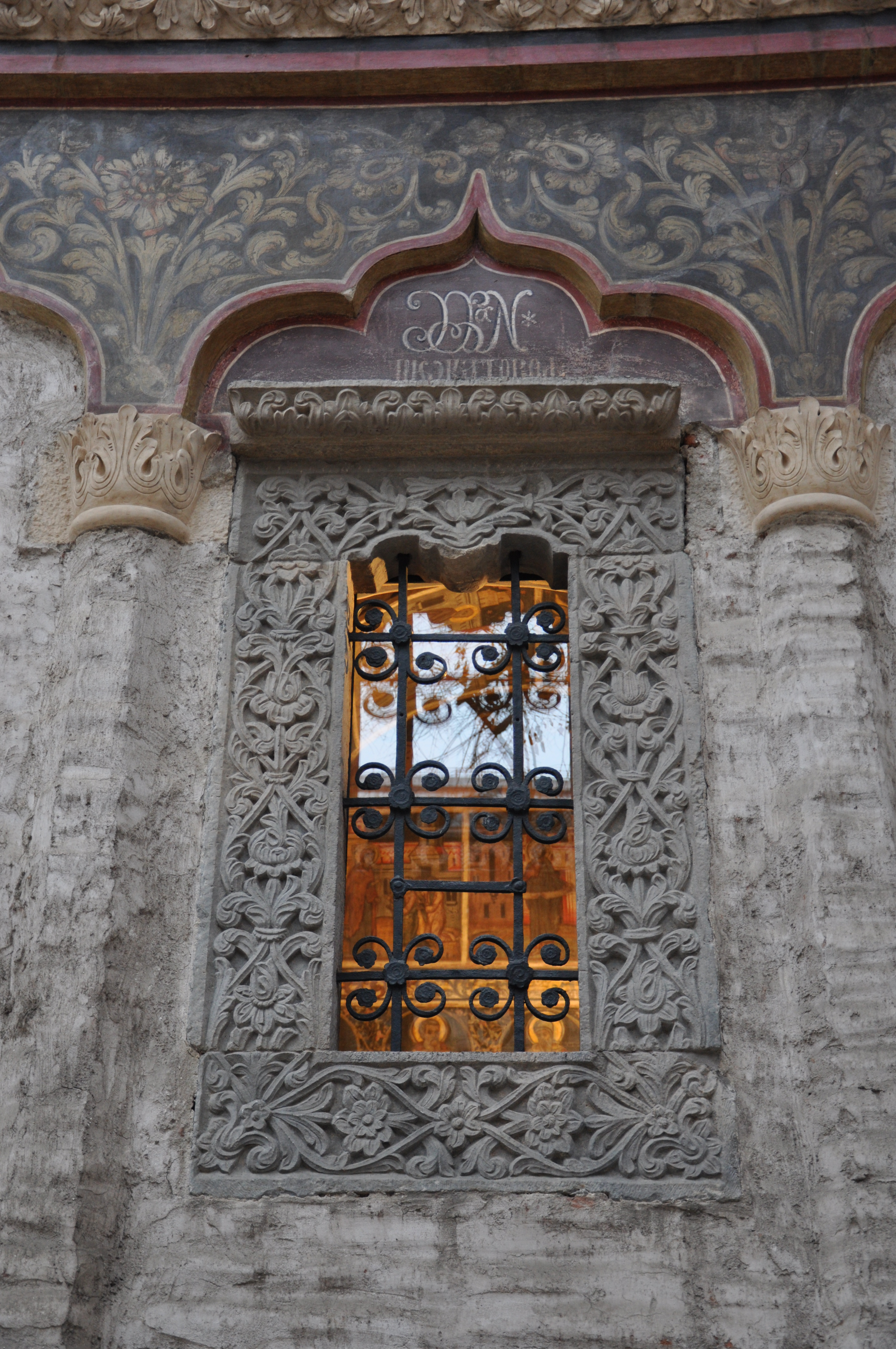
Brâncovenesc window of the Stavropoleos Monastery (Bucharest, Romania)

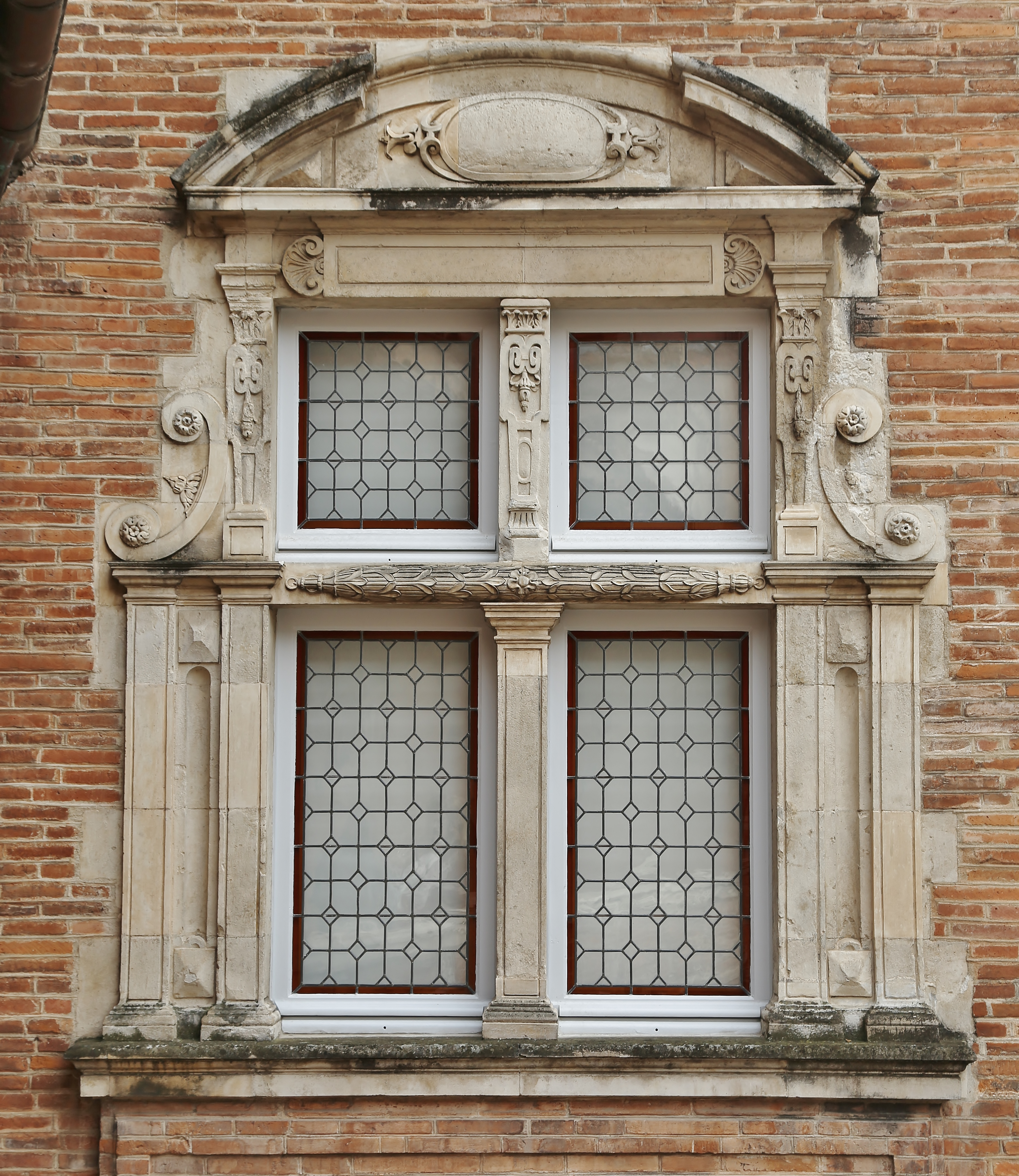
Renaissance window of the Hôtel d'Assézat (Toulouse, France)

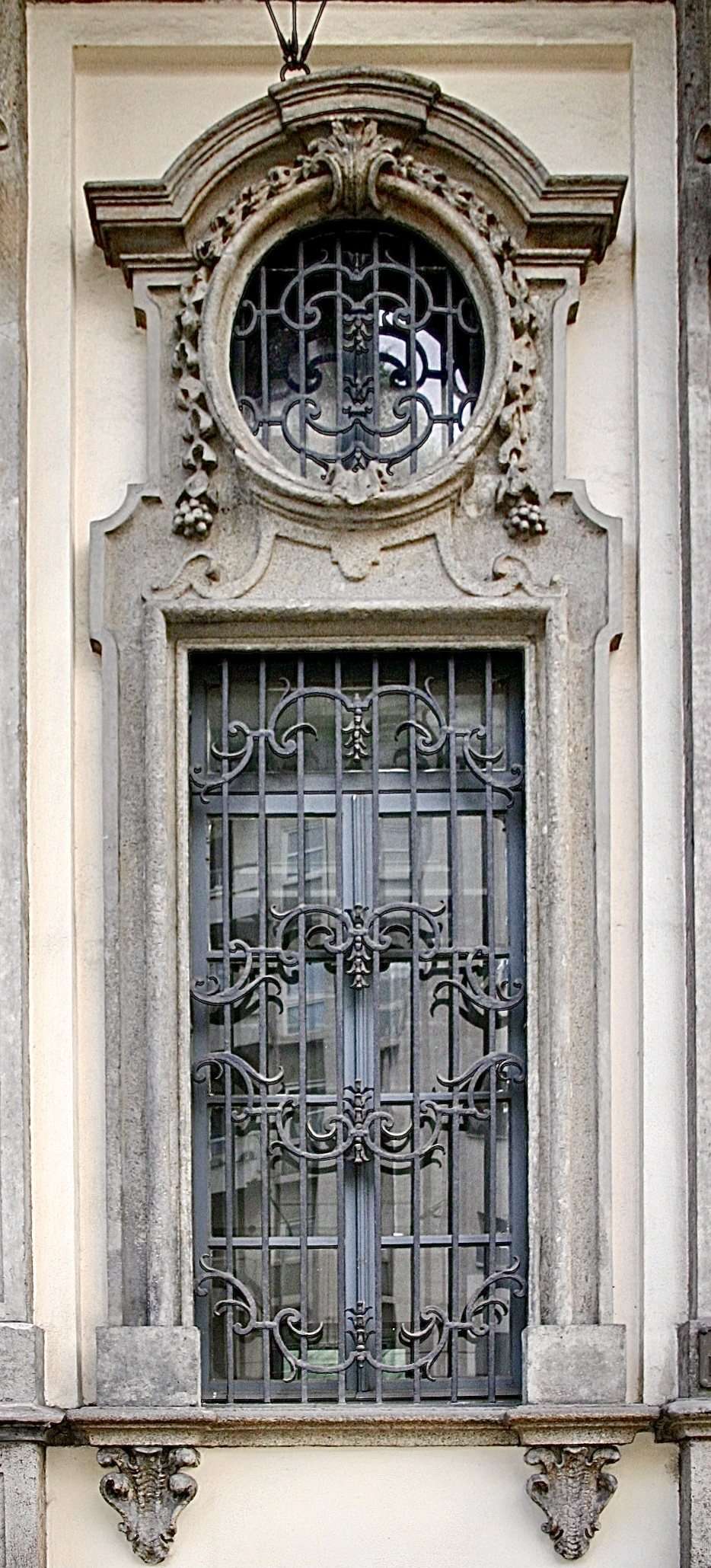
Baroque window of the Palazzo Sormani (Milan, Italy)

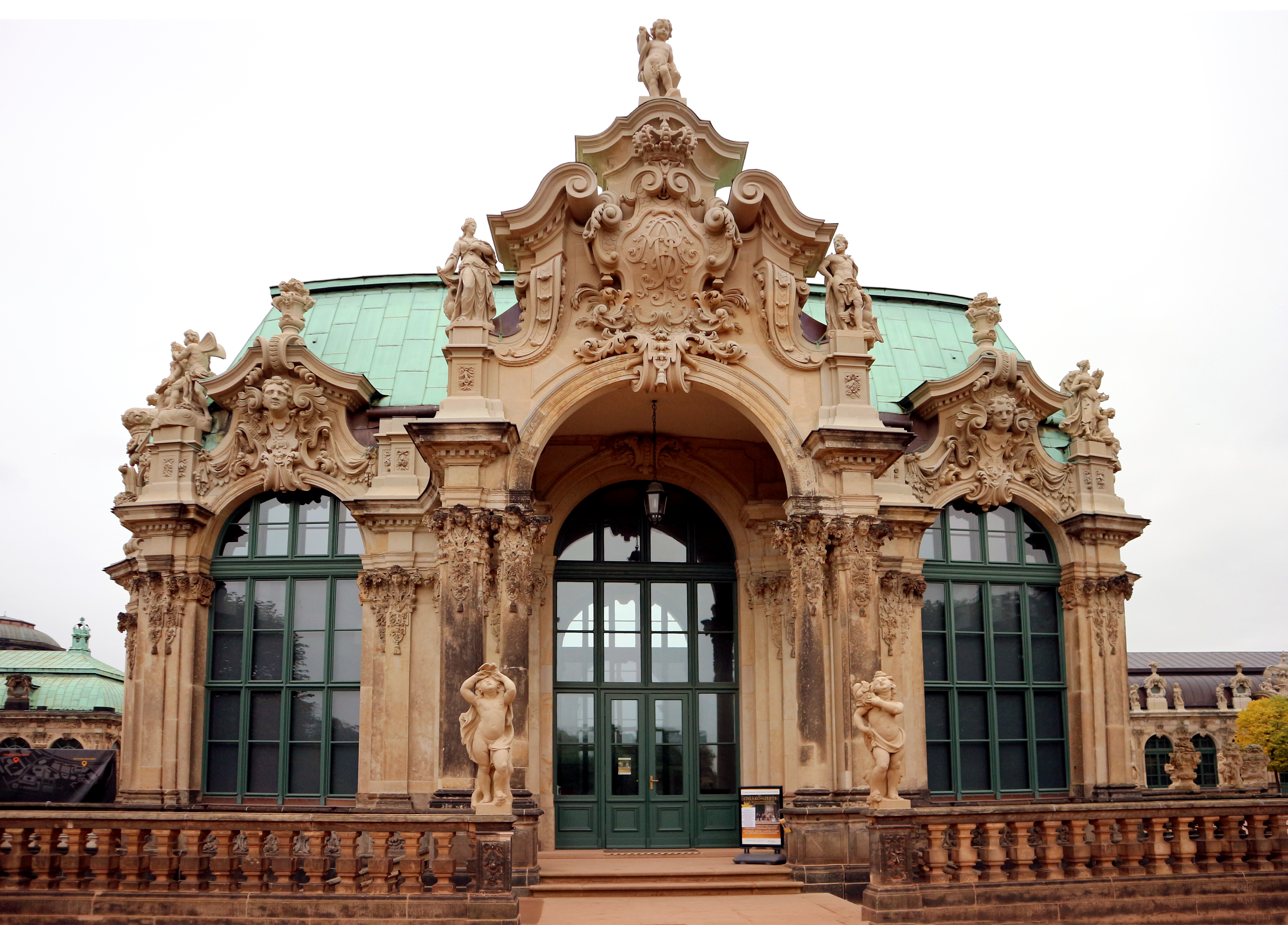
Rococo windows of the Zwinger (Dresden, Germany)

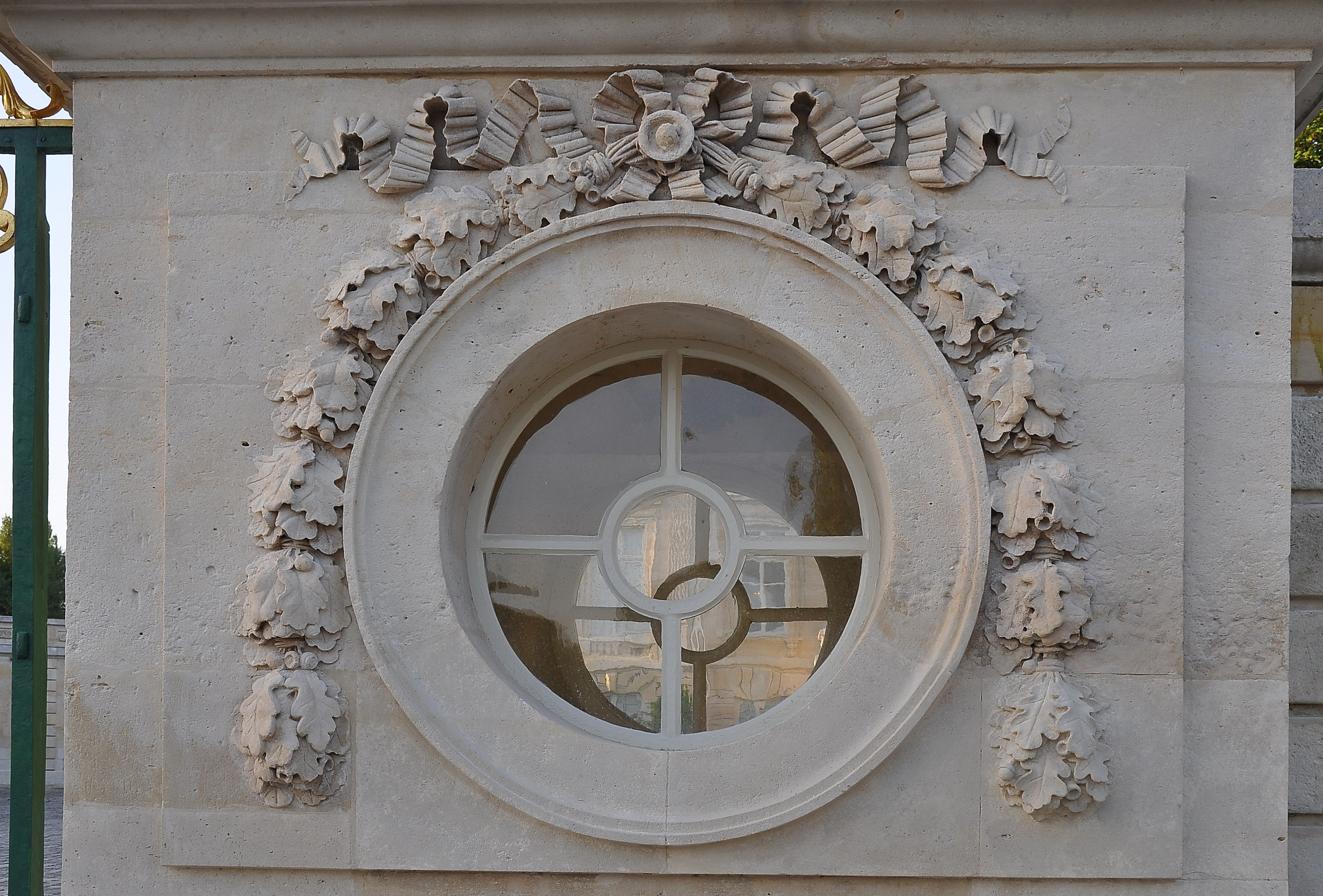
Louis XVI round window of the Petit Trianon (Versailles, France), with a festoon-derived ornament at the top

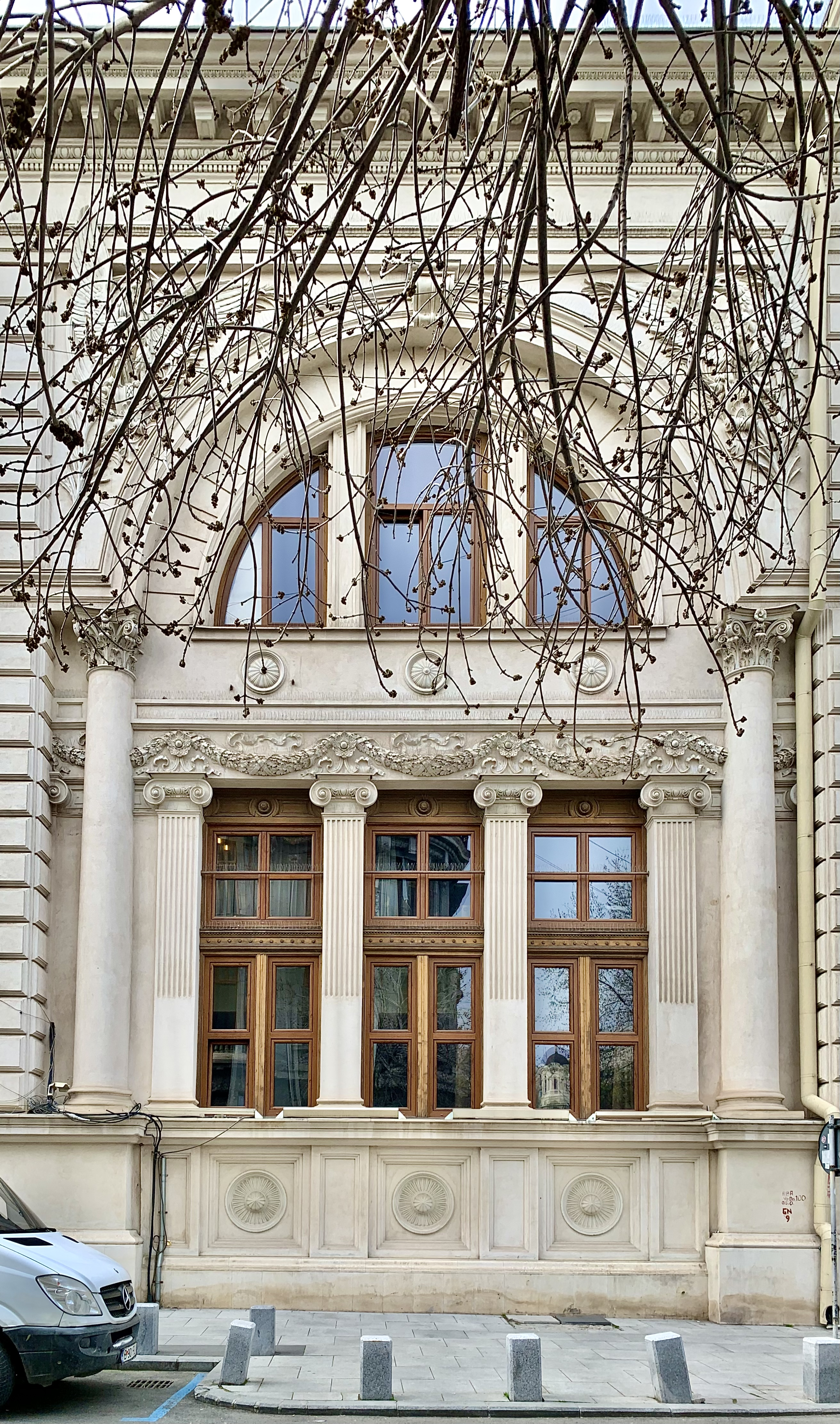
Neoclassical group of windows, on a lateral side of the Romanian Athenaeum (Bucharest)

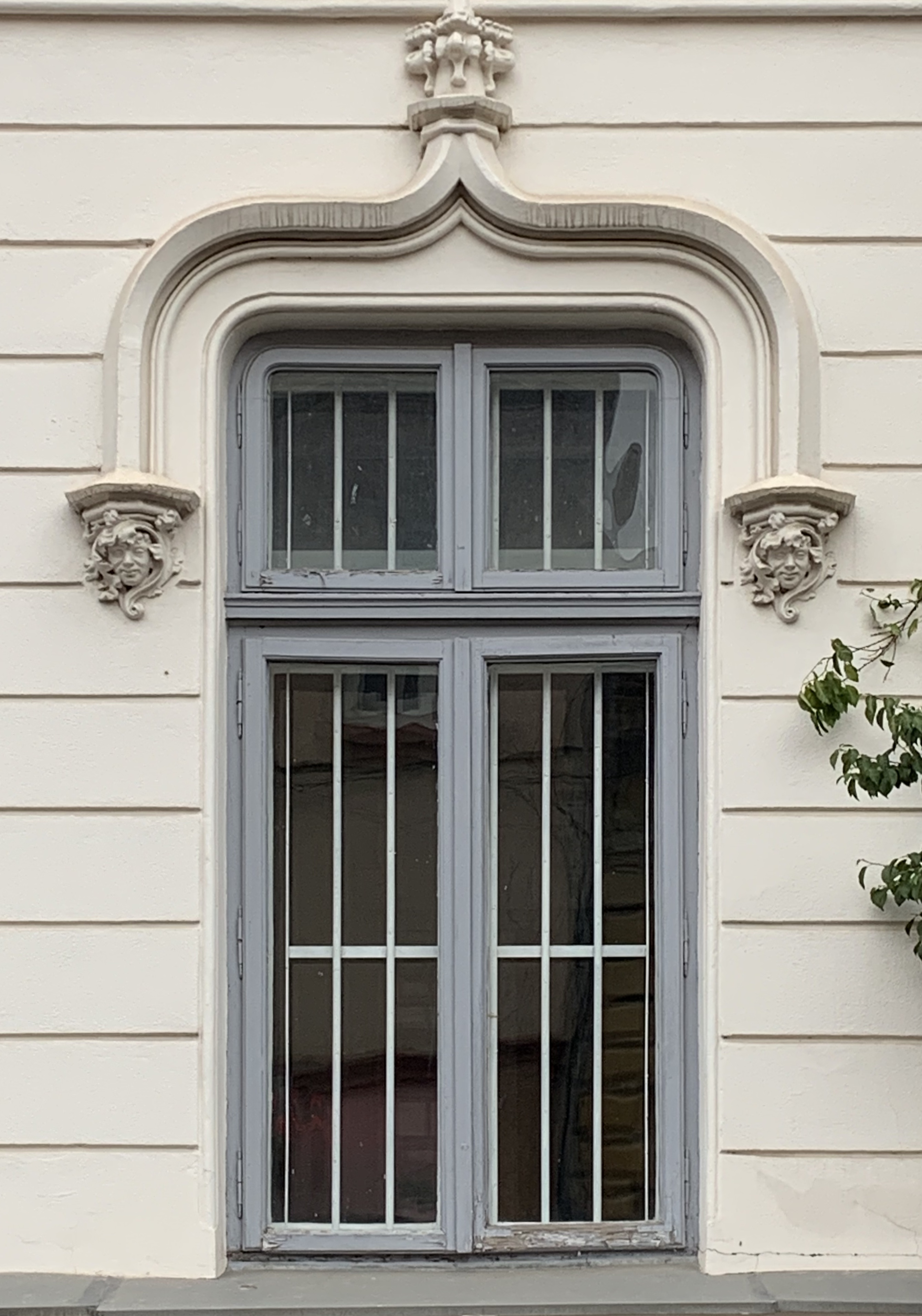
Gothic Revival window of a house on Strada Jean-Louis Calderon (Bucharest)

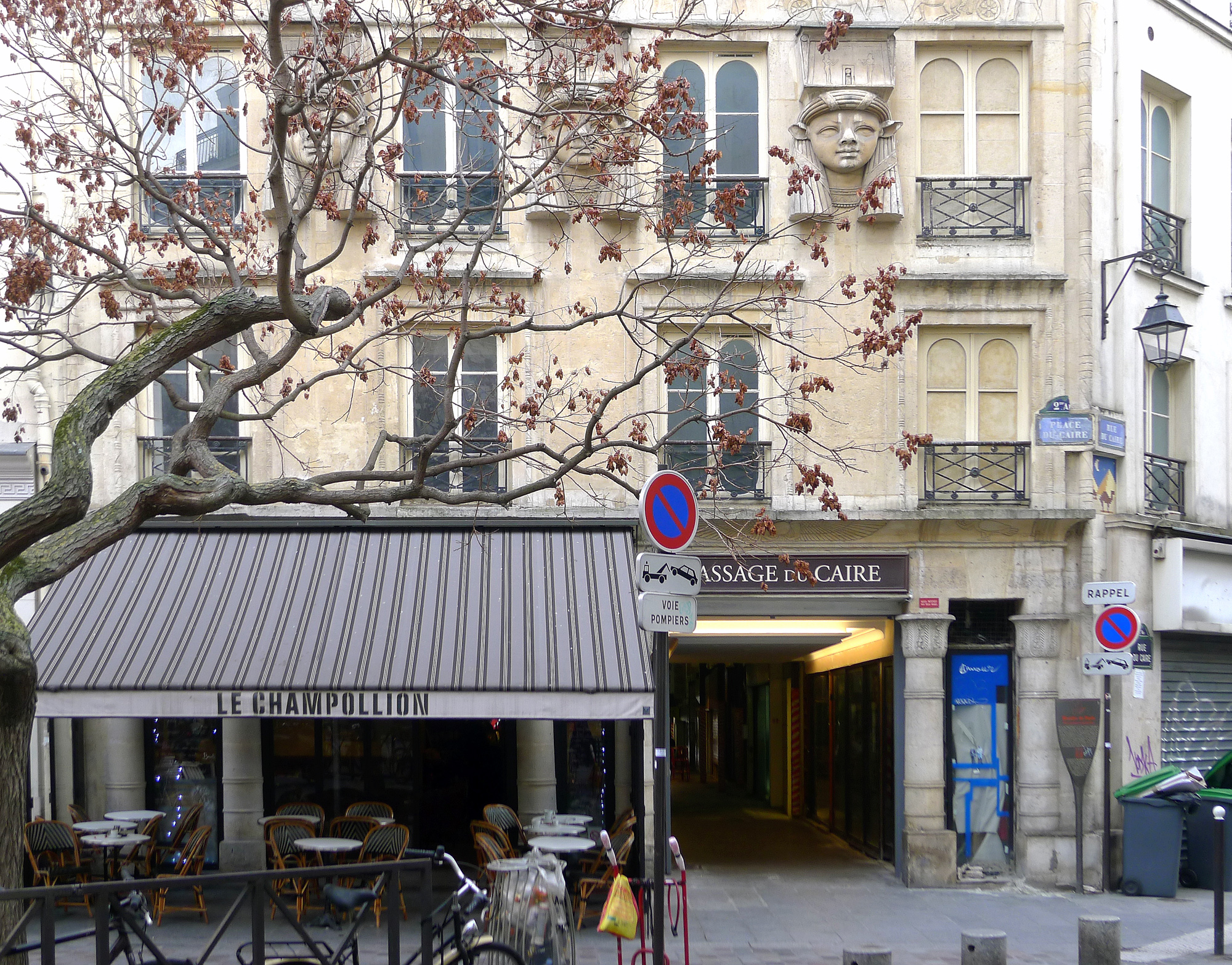
Egyptian Revival windows of a building in Place du Caire (Paris)

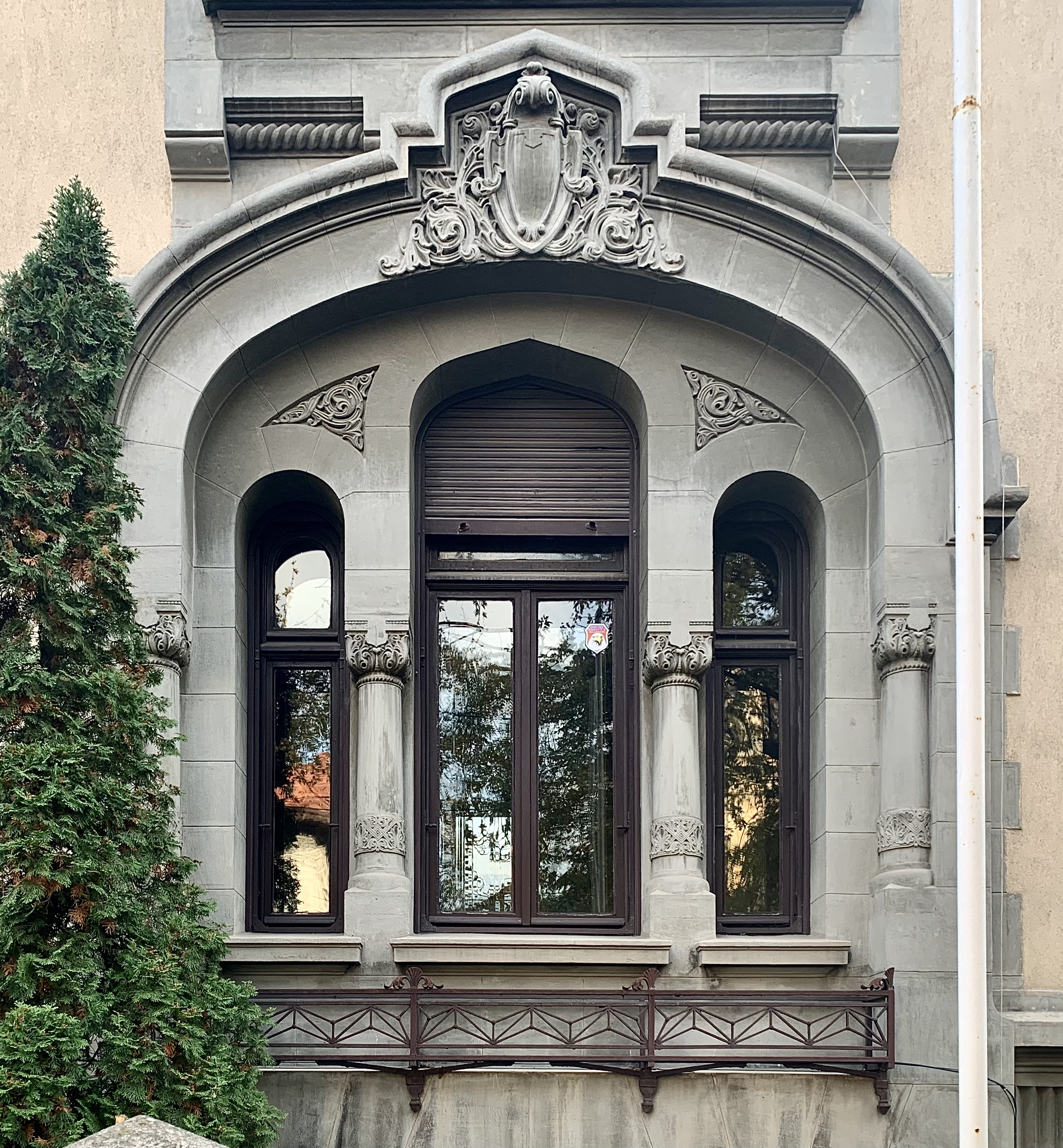
Romanian Revival window of a house on Bulevardul Dacia (Bucharest)

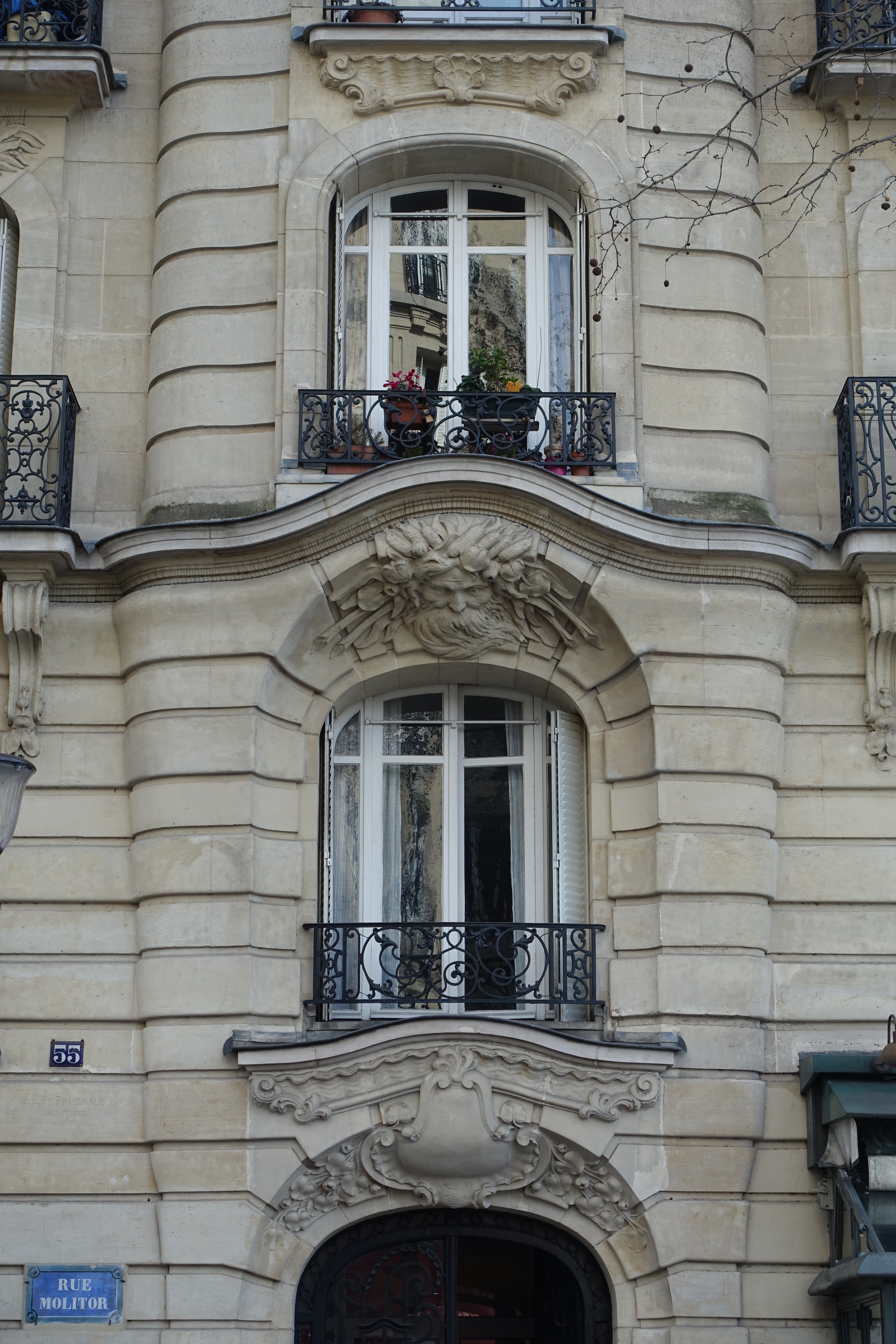
19th century Eclectic Classicist windows on Rue Molitor (Paris)

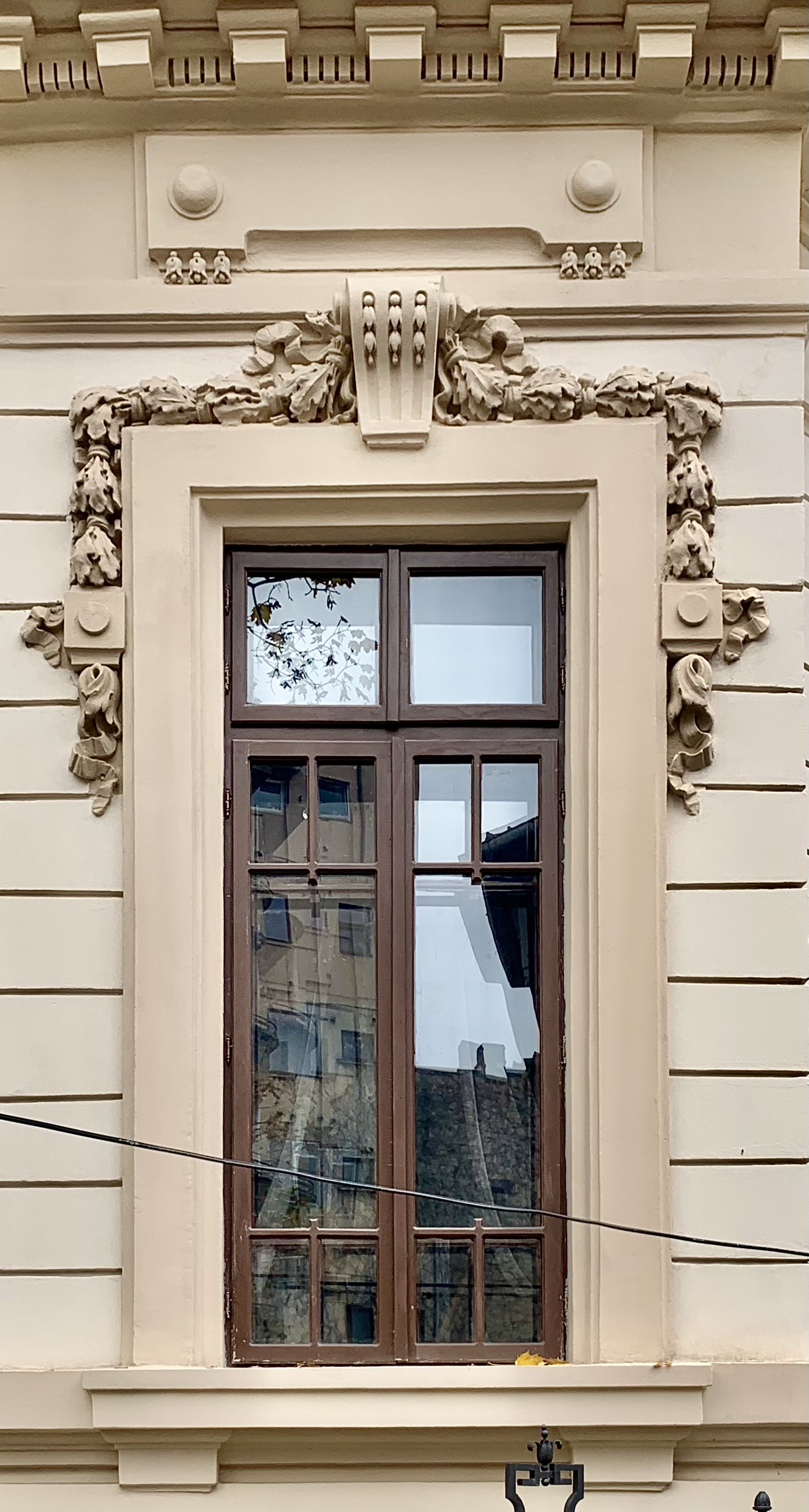
Beaux-Arts window of the Stroescu House on Strada Dianei (Bucharest)

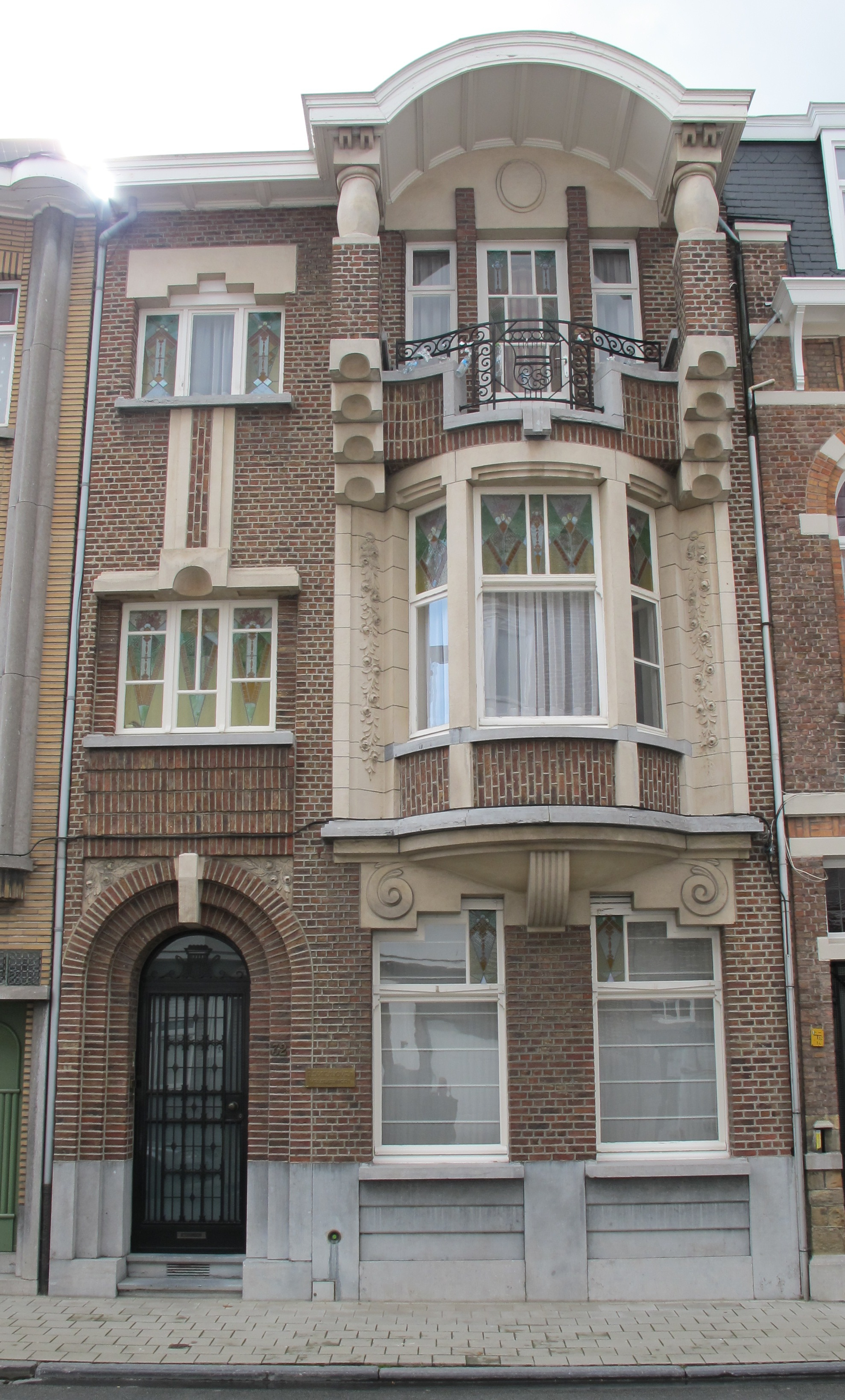
Art Deco house with stained glass windows on Stillemansstraat (Sint-Niklaas, Belgium)

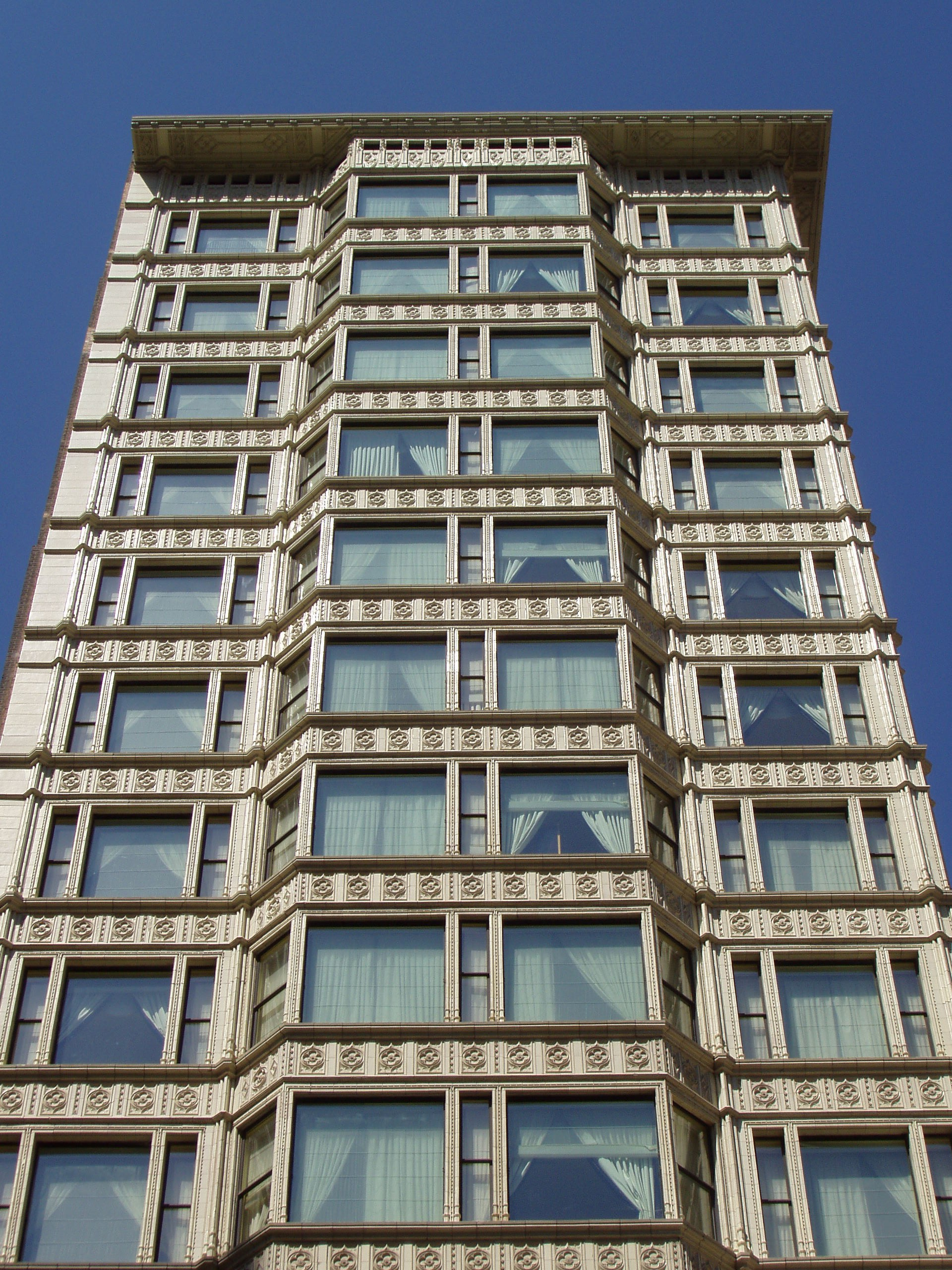
Chicago windows of the Reliance Building (Chicago)

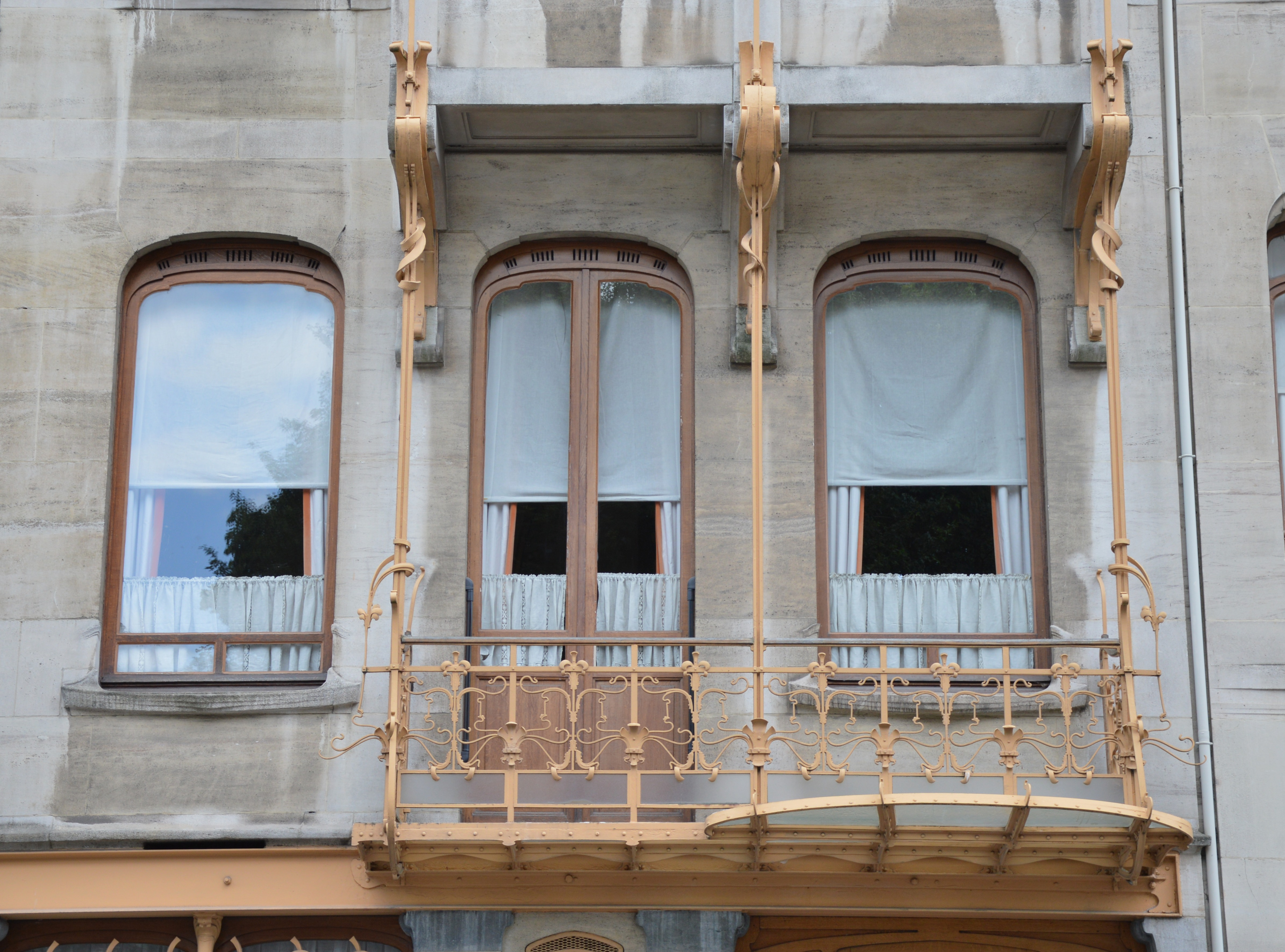
Art Nouveau windows of the Horta Museum (Brussels, Belgium)

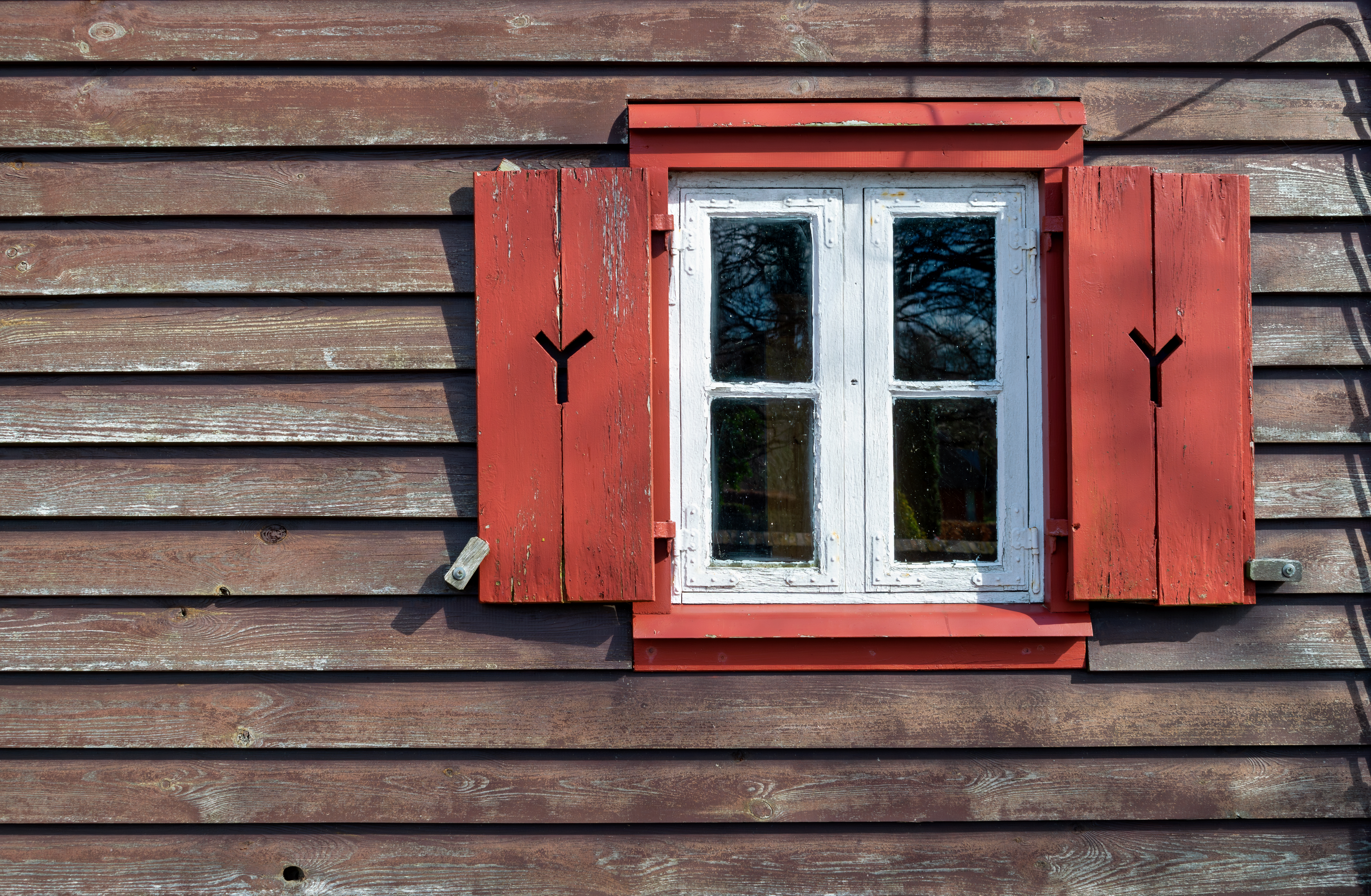
Window with shutters of the Lutheran wooden church in Born auf dem Darß (Germany)

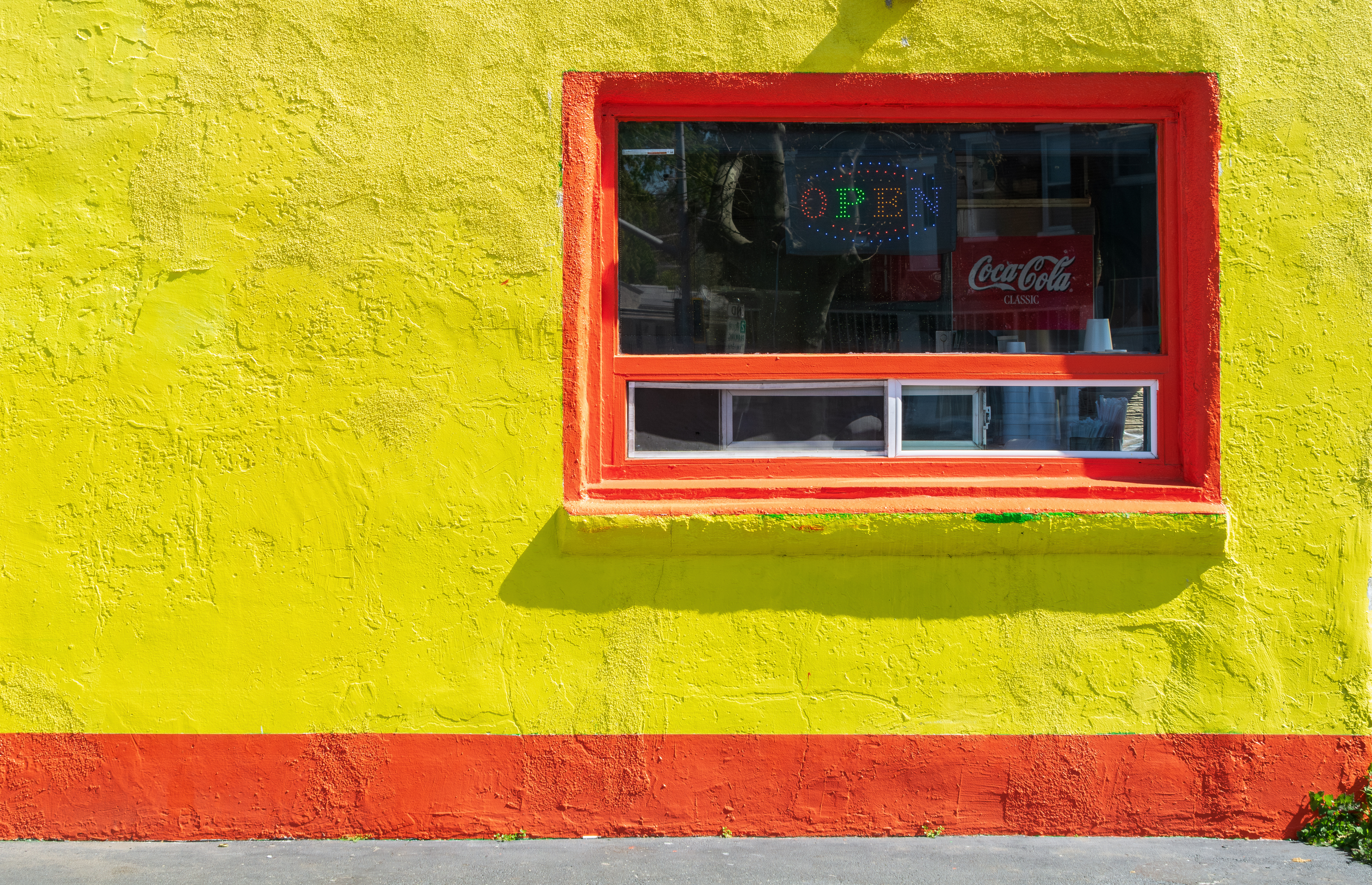
Serving window of a Mexican restaurant in the city of Chico (California)

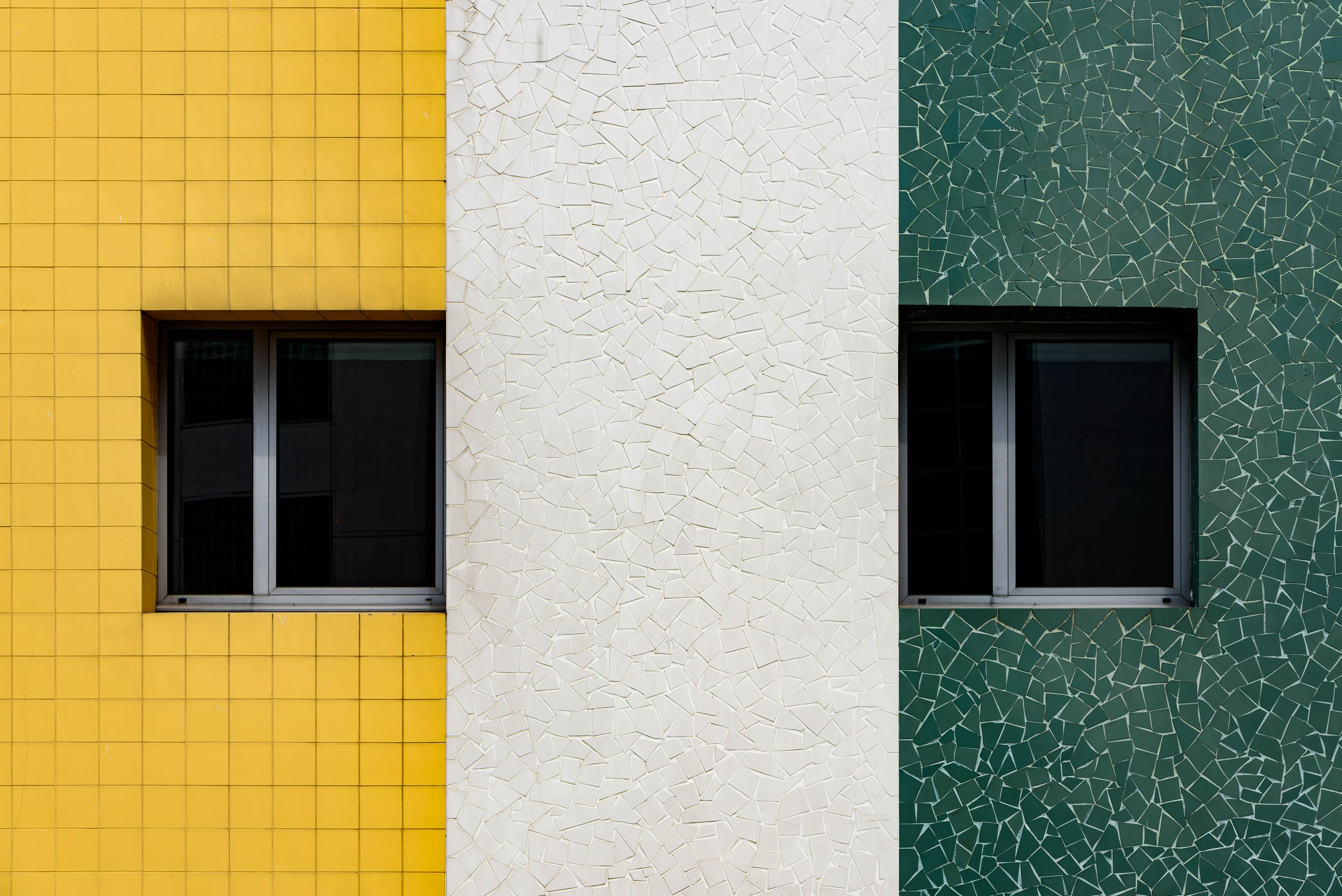
Postmodern windows of the Cité de la musique (Paris)

Contemporary windows of Cathedral Plaza Bucharest

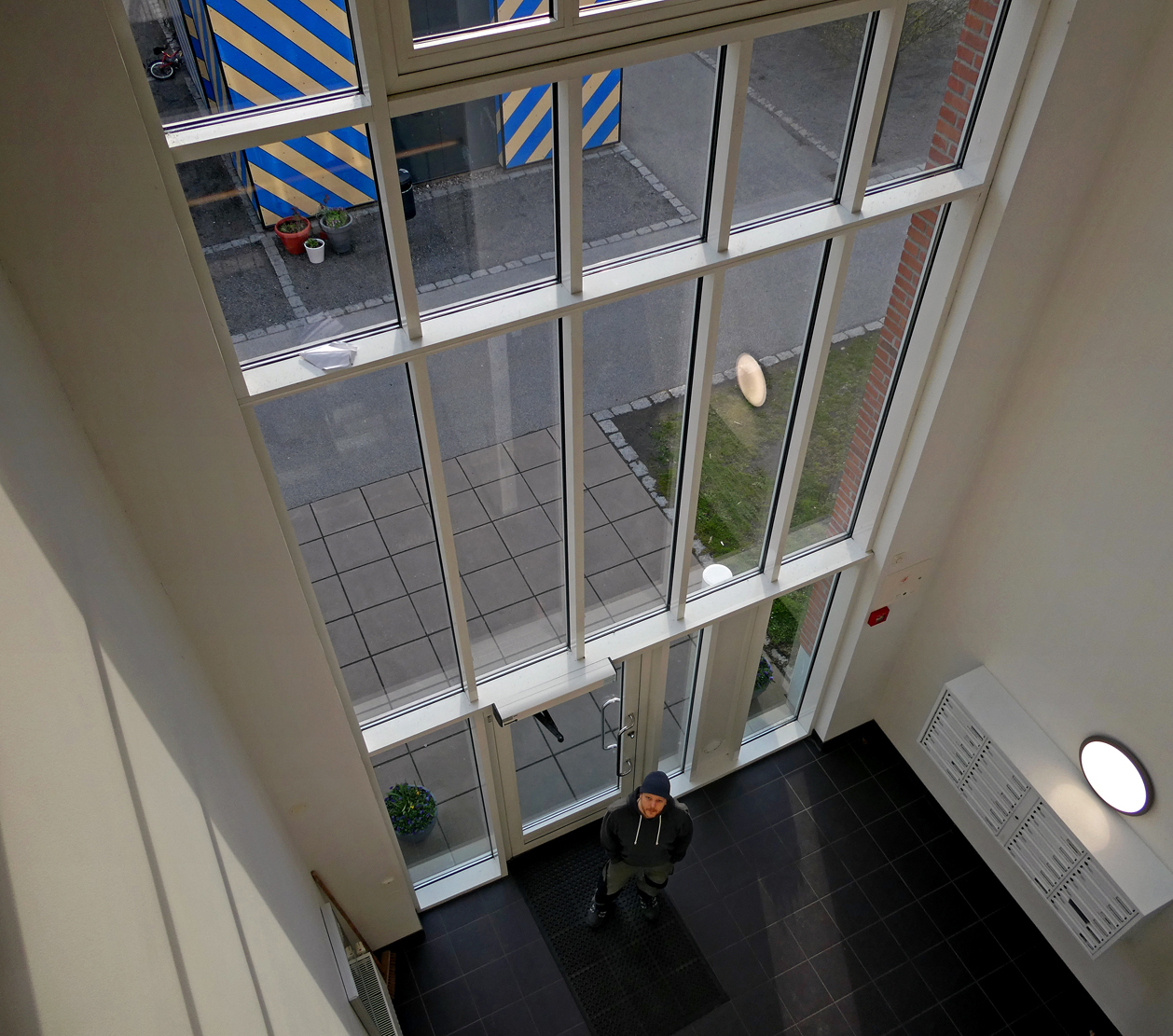
Very high windows in the entrance to a residential building in Ystad

== See also ==
- Airflow window – Ventilated double glazing
- Architectural glass – Building material
- Crown glass – Early type of window glass
- Demerara window – Colonial architecture-style window
- Display window – Type of shop display
- Fortochka – Small ventilation window, mostly found in Russia
- Glass mullion system – Glazing system using clamps and plates
- Greased paper window – Window made of paper coated with grease
- Insulated glazing – Construction element consisting of at least two glass plates
- Plate glass – Glass made of flat sheets
- Porthole – Window of a ship
- Rose window – Circular window found in Gothic churches
- Window covering – Material used to cover a window for functional purposes
- Window tax – Property tax based on the number of windows in a house
- Witch window – Window rotated 45° from vertical
