= Sash window =

Window made of one or more movable panels

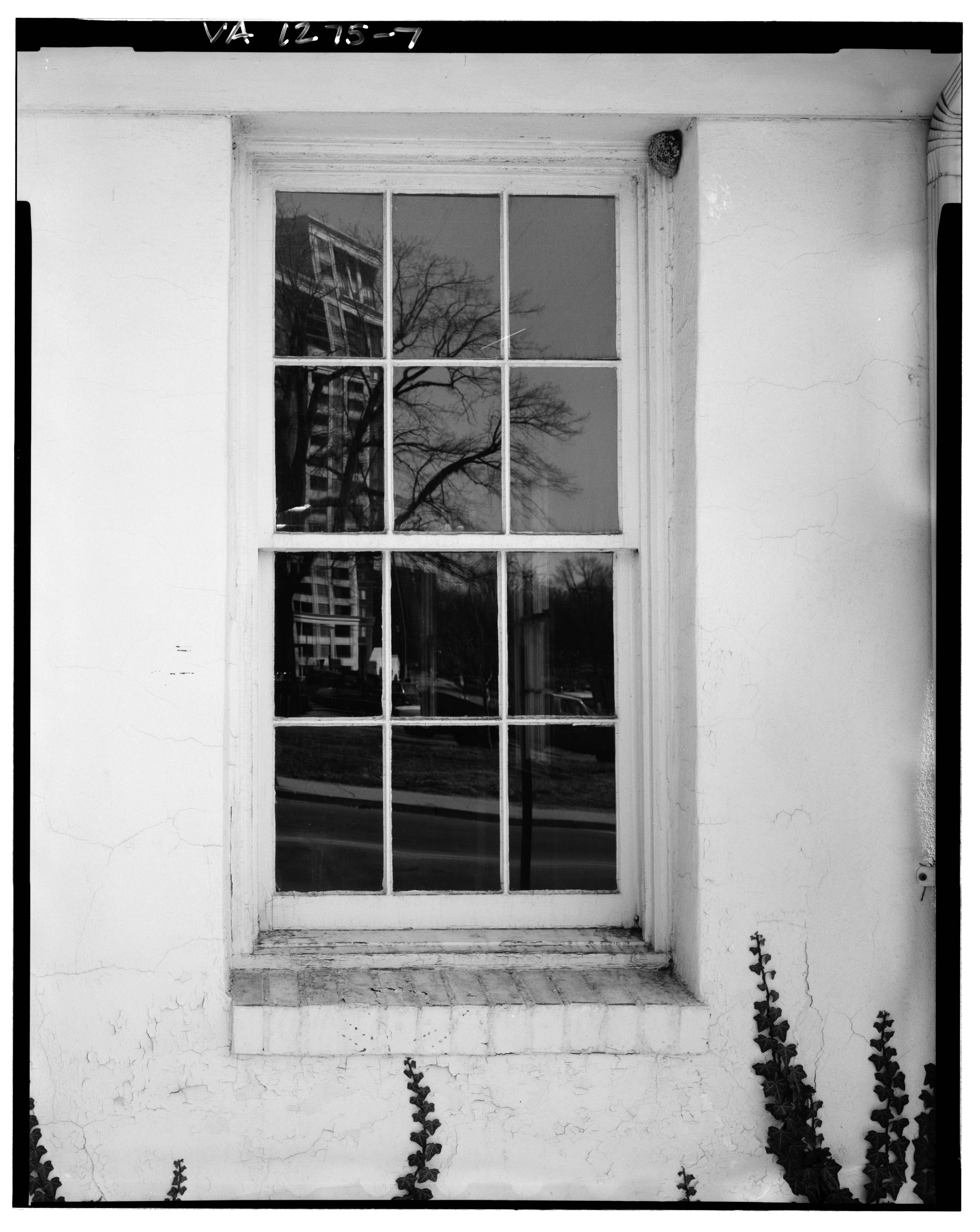
A sash window

A sash window or hung sash window is made of one or more movable panels, or "sashes". (Note: Due to the word's etymology, "sash" (without -es) is an alternative plural form, now used mostly by professionals.) The individual sashes are traditionally paned windows, but can now contain an individual sheet (or sheets, in the case of double glazing) of glass.

== History ==
The oldest surviving examples of sash windows were installed in England in the 1670s, for example at Palace House, and Ham House. The invention of the sash window is sometimes credited, without conclusive evidence, to Robert Hooke. Others see the sash window as a Dutch invention. H.J. Louw believed that the sash window was developed in England, but concluded that it was impossible to determine the exact inventor.

The sash window is often found in Georgian and Victorian houses, and the classic arrangement has three panes across by two up on each of two sash, giving a six over six panel window, although this is by no means a fixed rule. Innumerable late Victorian and Edwardian suburban houses were built in England using standard sash window units approximately 4 feet (1.2 m) in width, but older, hand-made units could be of any size.

== Mechanism and application ==
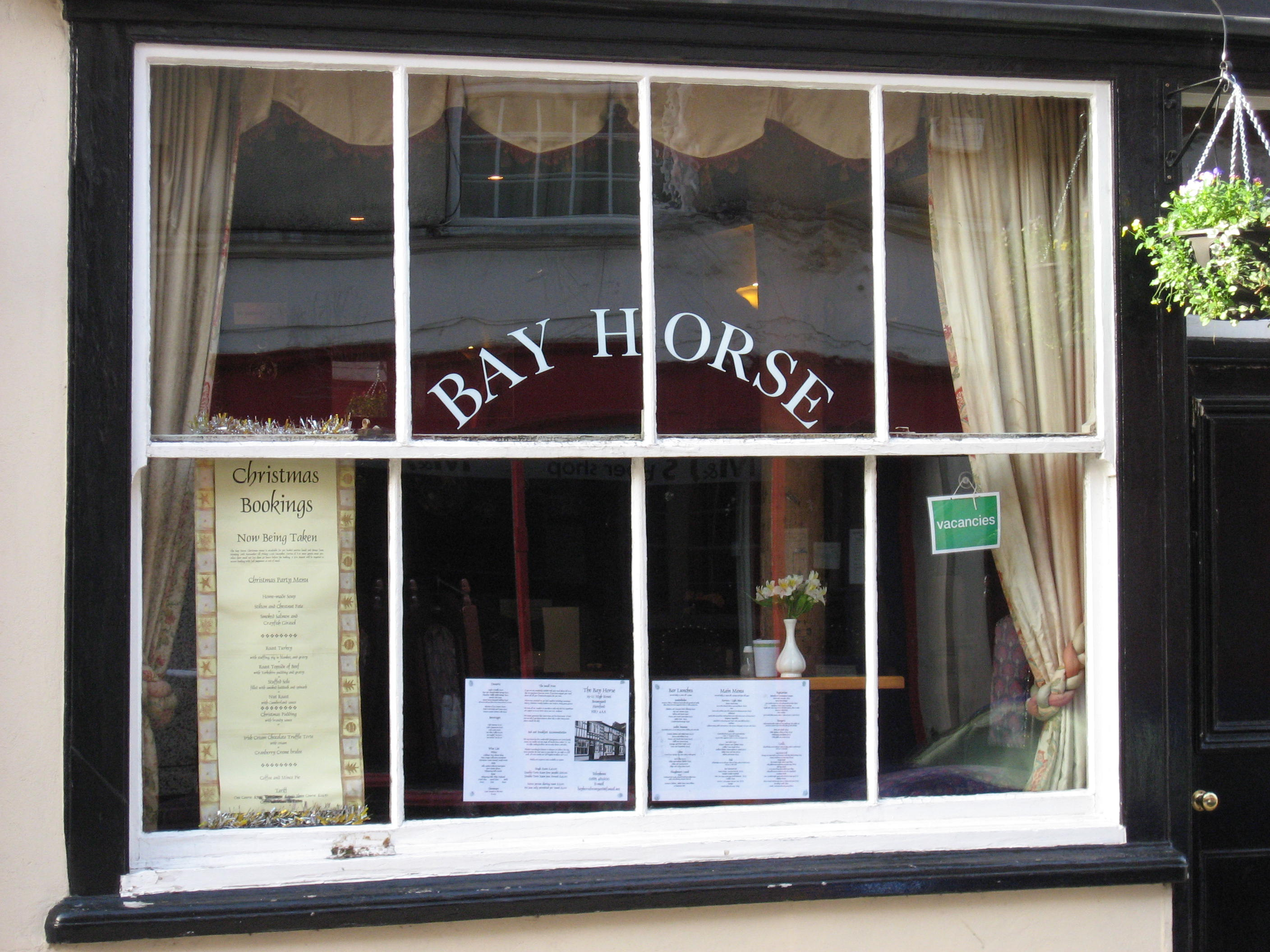
Exceptionally wide sash window (approximately two metres or 6.6 feet wide) in a pub in Bromyard, Herefordshire, England

=== Box sash window ===
To facilitate operation, the weight of the glazed panel is usually balanced by a heavy steel, lead, or cast-iron sash weight or counter-weight concealed within the window frame. The sash weight is connected to the window by a braided cotton sash cord, or a chain, that runs over a pulley at the top of the frame, although spring balances are sometimes used. Repairing a broken cord requires disassembling parts of the window frame.

The term "sash windows" is used interchangeably with the term "box sash windows" in the United Kingdom, and frequently used to describe the same thing. Historically box sash windows are heavier and more stately in nature than modern sash windows, but both terms are used within the industry when referring to the same type of window.

The name "hung sash window", which is more usual in the United States than in the United Kingdom, typically refers to a double-hung window with two sashes that can move up and down in the window frame. These windows are commonly found in older buildings in warmer climates, as they promote airflow and are easy to clean. A significant advantage of double-hung windows is that they provide efficient cooling of interiors during warm weather. In many cases, there is a second interchangeable pane that covers the outside of the entire window, glass in the winter and a screen in the summer. Opening both the top and bottom of a sash window by equal amounts allows warm air at the top of the room to escape, thus drawing relatively cool air from outside into the room through the bottom opening. With the glass outer pane in place, a dead air gap is created to increase the insulation value. A double-hung window where the upper sash is smaller (shorter) than the lower is termed a cottage window.

A single-hung window has two sashes, but normally the top sash is fixed and only the bottom sash slides. Triple- and quadruple-hung windows are used for tall openings, common in New England churches. Construction is usually of softwood, and these sashes were traditionally only single-glazed.

=== Simplex hinges ===
Sash windows may be fitted with simplex hinges, which allow the window to be locked into hinges on one side while the counterbalance on the other side is detached, allowing the window to be opened for escape or cleaning.

=== Glazing ===
The glass in old windows can be the very early 'plate' or 'broad' glass to 'crown' or 'cylinder'. Old glass is recognised by its imperfections ('ream') which result in optical distortion. Traditional cylinder glass is still made, but other sorts of antique glass are no longer available.

Modern double-glazed sash windows are available. These may have true muntins or "glazing bars", or may imitate them by applying them to the surface of the glazing, giving the appearance of multiple small panes, whereas each sash consists of only one large double-glazed unit.

== Issues ==
Traditional problems with solid wooden sash windows include rot, swelling or distortion of the woodwork or rattling in the wind (due to shrinkage of the wood). These problems can be solved by careful repair and the introduction of draught stripping. It is also a common problem for painters to paint the sash stuck. The sliding mechanism makes sash windows more vulnerable to these problems than traditional casement windows. Sash windows are relatively high maintenance, but offer advantages in return (style, aesthetics, compliance with laws relating to older houses and buildings, use of natural resources etc.). However, well-maintained sash windows should last generations without needing parts replaced. It is also possible to clean all the glass from within the building by sliding the two panes to different positions.

uPVC or vinyl sash windows have become available since the first PVC window frames were being introduced in Germany in the 1960s. They have come to dominate the window industry with more than 50% of all window sashes being made of vinyl in the US as of 2017. The waterproof nature of uPVC and ease of installation are also benefits. Problems with uPVC include durability and the environmental issues. Over time the plasticizer chemicals used to make vinyl sashes flexible evaporate leaving the material brittle and prone to breaking. Vinyl is also weaker than wood and aluminum sashes and requires extra support in large window openings. Vinyl is also used on wood windows as an outside cladding to protect the wood from the weather but allow the inside of the window to take advantage of the appearance of fine wood. Vinyl is also available in a large range of colours and textures although white is by far the most common. Vinyl is limited mainly to residential usage and low rise commercial due to its flammability and the toxic fumes it produces when burned. In the future fire rated versions of UPVC windows may be used in high rise construction, but currently flammability and toxic fumes are a significant obstacle.

== See also ==
- Witch window
- Fortochka
