= Apotropaic magic =

Magic intended to turn away harm or evil influences

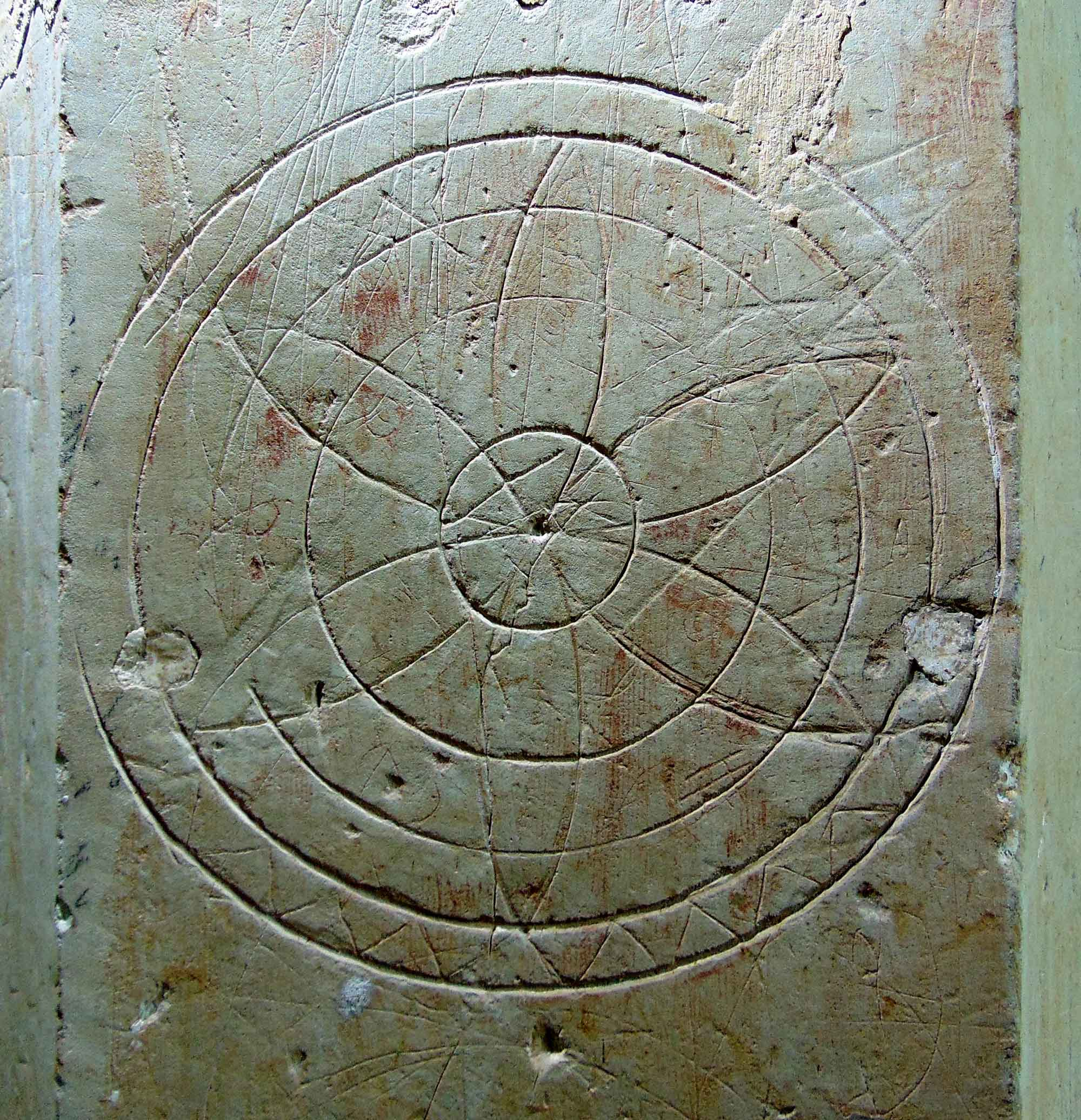
Medieval, apotropaic, hexafoil marking; interior of Worlington church, Suffolk, England

Apotropaic magic (From Ancient Greek: ἀποτρέπω, romanized: apotrépō, lit. 'to ward off') or protective magic is a type of magic intended to turn away harm or evil influences, as in deflecting misfortune or averting the evil eye. Apotropaic observances may also be practiced out of superstition or out of tradition, as in good luck charms (perhaps some token on a charm bracelet), amulets, or gestures such as crossed fingers or knocking on wood, or as part of complex rituals of social transformation such as migration. Many different objects and charms are used for protection by many peoples throughout history.

== Symbols and objects ==
=== Ancient Egypt ===
Apotropaic magical rituals were practiced throughout the ancient Near East and ancient Egypt. Fearsome deities were invoked via ritual in order to protect individuals by warding away evil spirits. In ancient Egypt, these household rituals (performed in the home, not in state-run temples) were embodied by the deity who personified magic itself, Heka. The two gods most frequently invoked in these rituals were the hippopotamus-formed fertility goddess, Taweret, and the lion-deity, Bes (who developed from the early apotropaic dwarf god, Aha, lit. 'fighter').

Objects were often used in these rituals in order to facilitate communication with the gods. One of the most commonly found magical objects, the ivory apotropaic wand (birth tusk), gained widespread popularity in the Middle Kingdom (c. 2040 – 1782 BCE). These wands were used to protect expectant mothers and children from malevolent forces, and were adorned with processions of apotropaic solar deities. The cowroid amulet (imitating the cowrie shell) was also used to protect pregnant mothers and children, and was typically incorporated into a woman's girdle.

Likewise, protective amulets bearing the likenesses of gods and goddesses such as Taweret were commonly worn. Water came to be used frequently in ritual as well, wherein libation vessels in the shape of Taweret were used to pour healing water over an individual. In much later periods (when Egypt came under the Greek Ptolemies), stele featuring the god Horus were used in similar rituals; water would be poured over the stele and—after ritually acquiring healing powers—was collected in a basin for an afflicted person to drink.

=== Ancient Greece ===
The ancient Greeks had various protective symbols and objects, with various names, such as apotropaia, probaskania, periammata, periapta, profylaktika, phylaktiria, antipharmaca, alexicaca, alexipharmaca and alexima pharmaca.

The Greeks made offerings to the "averting gods" (ἀποτρόπαιοι θεοί, apotropaioi theoi), chthonic deities and heroes who grant safety and deflect evil and for the protection of infants they attached to their swaddling clothes amulets with apotropaic powers, committing their children to the care of kourotrophic (child-nurturing) deities. There were also the Ἀποπομπαῖοι θεοί ("gods who send away/drive away/dismiss evil") and Ἀπωσίκακοι θεοί ("evil-averting gods"). The Greeks gave the epithet Alexicacus (Ἀλεξίκακος), meaning "averter of evil", to several deities, including Zeus, Apollo, Heracles and Leucothea. Keramyntes (Κηραμύντης, "averter of evil") was an epithet of Heracles, reflecting his role as a protector who warded off evil. Greeks placed talismans in their houses and wore amulets to protect them from the evil eye. They also attached charms to animals. Peisistratus hung the figure of a kind of grasshopper before the Acropolis of Athens for protection. Yet another form of apotropaic magic involved the use of the ancient and quasi-nonsensical formulae known as the Ephesia Grammata. Greeks used the expression Ἡράκλεις ("Heracles") as an exclamation of anger or frustration, invoking Heracles as a protector against evil for those experiencing hardship. They also gave offerings and made sacrifices to ward off evil.

Another way for protection from enchantment used by the ancient Greeks was by spitting into the folds of the clothes.

Ancient Greeks also had an old custom of dressing boys as girls in order to avert the evil eye.

Ancient Greek sources state that anagyros (Ἀνάγυρος), also known as onogyros (Ὀνόγυρος), was a plant described as evil-averting and foul-smelling, particularly when rubbed or crushed.

=== Crosses ===
In Ireland, it is customary on St Brigid's Day to weave a Brigid's cross from rushes, which is hung over doors and windows to protect the household from fire, lightning, illness and evil spirits. In ancient Ireland and even up to relatively modern times, it was formerly the custom at Samhain to weave a cross of sticks and straw called a 'parshell' or 'parshall', which was fixed over the doorway to ward off bad luck, illness, and witchcraft.

=== Eyes ===
Eyes were often painted to ward off the evil eye. An exaggerated apotropaic eye or a pair of eyes were painted on Greek drinking vessels called kylikes (eye-cups) from the 6th century BCE up until the end of the end of the classical period. The exaggerated eyes may have been intended to prevent evil spirits from entering the mouth while drinking. Fishing boats in some parts of the Mediterranean region still have stylised eyes painted on the bows. The defunct Turkish budget airline, Fly Air, adopted the symbol nazar boncuğu (nazar bonjuk) on the vertical stabilizer (fin) of its aeroplanes. The apotropaic Yiddish expression, קיין עין הרע, kain ein horeh, 'no evil eye' (in modern Hebrew, בלי עין הרע, bli ein ha'ra), is somewhat equivalent to the expression, "knock on wood."

=== Faces ===
Among the ancient Greeks, the most widely used image intended to avert evil was that of the Gorgon, the head of which now may be called the Gorgoneion, which features wild eyes, fangs, and protruding tongue. The full figure of the Gorgon holds the apex of the oldest remaining Greek temple where she is flanked by two lionesses. The Gorgon head was mounted on the aegis and shield of Athena.

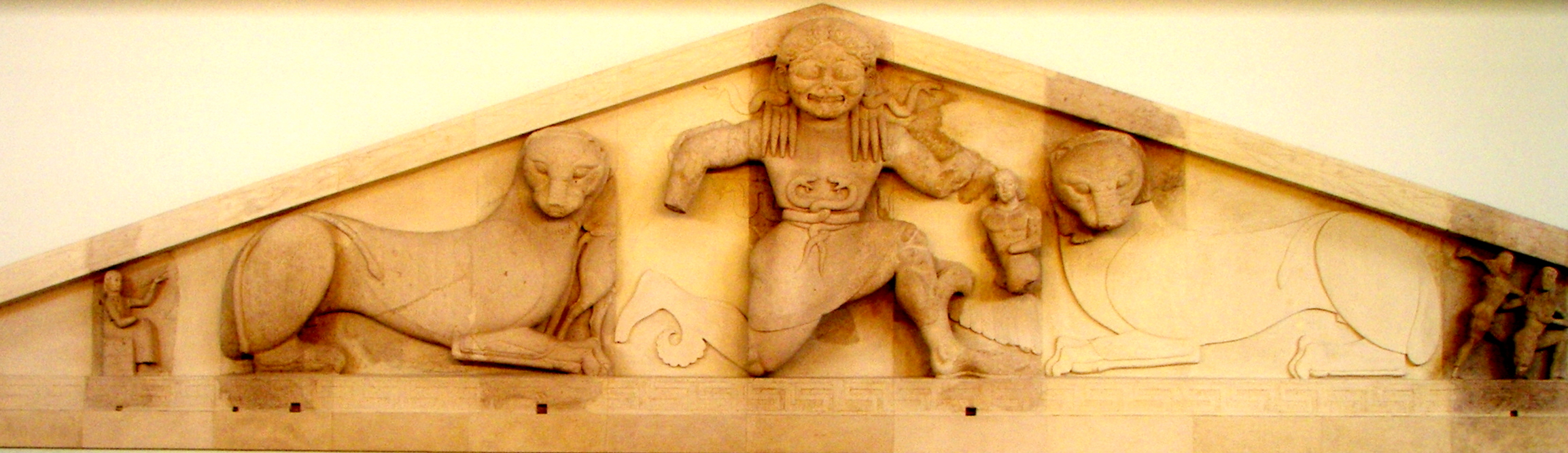
The Gorgon, flanked by lionesses and showing her belt clasp of serpents; the pediment of the 580 BCE temple of Artemis in Corfu. Archaeological Museum of Corfu.

People believed that the doorways and windows of buildings were particularly vulnerable to the entry or passage of evil. In ancient Greece, grotesque, satyr-like bearded faces, sometimes with the pointed cap of the workman, were carved over the doors of ovens and kilns, to protect the work from fire and mishap. Later, on churches and castles, gargoyles or other grotesque faces and figures such as sheela na gigs and hunky punks were carved to frighten away witches and other malign influences. Figures may also have been carved at fireplaces or chimneys; in some cases, simple geometric or letter carvings were used for these. When a wooden post was used to support a chimney opening, this was often an easier material for amateur carving. To discourage witchcraft, rowan wood may have been chosen for the post or mantel.

Similarly the grotesque faces carved into pumpkin lanterns (and their earlier counterparts, made from turnips, swedes or beets) at Halloween are meant to avert evil: this season was Samhain, the Celtic new year. As a "time between times", it was believed to be a period when souls of the dead and other dangerous spirits walked the earth. Many European peoples had such associations with the period following the harvest in the fall (for instance the Celtic calendar).

=== Phalluses ===
In Ancient Greece, phalloi were believed to have apotropaic qualities. Often stone reliefs would be placed above doorways, and three-dimensional versions were built across the Greek world. Most notable of these were the urban monuments found on the island of Delos. The phallus was also an apotropaic symbol for the ancient Romans. These are known as fascinum.

A similar use of phallic representations to ward off the evil eye remains popular in modern Bhutan. It is associated with the 500-year-old Buddhist tradition of Drukpa Kunley.

=== Reflective items and prisms ===
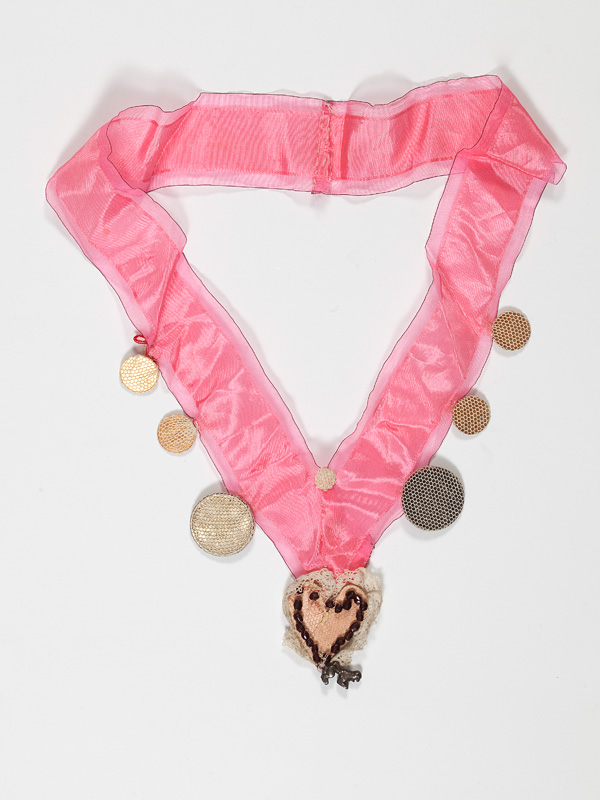
Jewish apotropaic neckband sewn with coins to deflect the evil eye. 1944, Basel, in the Jewish Museum of Switzerland's collection.

Mirrors and other shiny reflective objects were believed to deflect the evil eye. Traditional English "Plough Jags" (performers of a regional variant of the mummers play) sometimes decorated their costumes (particularly their hats) with shiny items, to the extent of borrowing silver plate for the purpose. "Witch balls" are shiny blown glass ornaments, such as Christmas baubles, that were hung in windows. Similarly, the Chinese Bagua mirror is usually installed to ward off negative energy and protect the entryways of residences.

An example of the use of shiny apotropaic objects in Judaism can be found in the so-called "Halsgezeige" or textile neckbands used in the birthing customs of the Franco-German border region. Shiny coins or colourful stones would be sewn onto the neckband or on a central amulet in order to distract the evil eye. These neckbands were worn by women in childbirth and by young boys during their Brit Milah ceremony. This custom continued until the early 20th century.

In the American Southwest, crystals, due to their semitransparency, are used by shamans to practice clairvoyance, identify objects created or enchanted by witches, and distinguish diseases (e.g., through charging medicine water).

=== Horseshoes ===
In Western culture, a horseshoe was often nailed up over, or close by, doorways (see Oakham's horseshoes). Model horseshoes (of card or plastic) are given as good-luck tokens, particularly at weddings, and small paper horseshoes feature in confetti.

=== Objects buried in walls ===
In early modern Europe, certain objects were buried in the walls of houses to protect the household from witchcraft. These included specially-prepared witch bottles, horse skulls and the bodies of dried cats, as well as shoes (see concealed shoes).

In the American Southwest, to fortify buildings in Acoma residences for future battles, priests embed projectile points into walls to impart their lightning energy, or anima, into the structures.

=== Markings on buildings ===
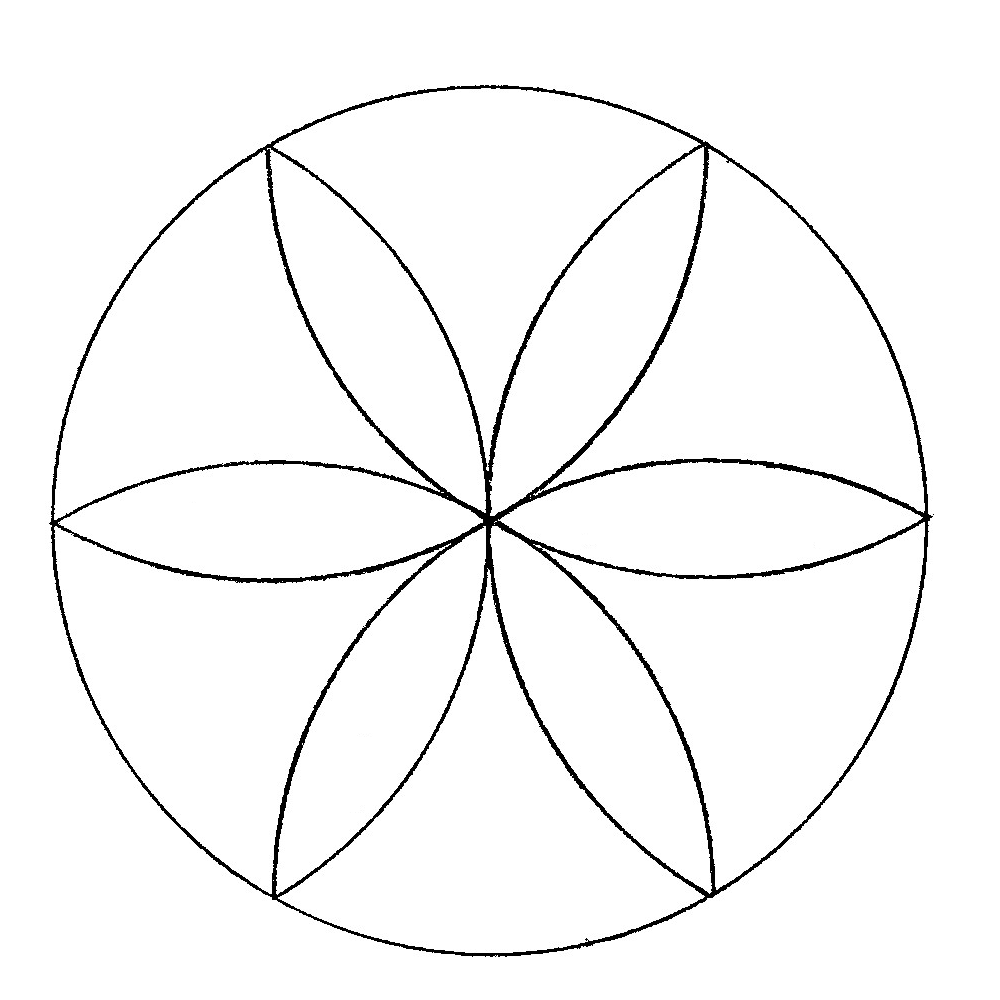
A hexafoil

Apotropaic marks, also called 'witch marks' or 'anti-witch marks' in Europe, are symbols or patterns scratched on the walls, beams and thresholds of buildings to protect them from witchcraft or evil spirits. They have many forms; in Britain they are often flower-like patterns of overlapping circles such as hexafoils. Taper burn marks on thresholds of early modern buildings are also thought to be apotropaic marks.

Other types of mark include the intertwined letters V and M or a double V (for the protector, the Virgin Mary, alias Virgo Virginum), and crisscrossing lines to confuse any spirits that might try to follow them.

At the Bradford-on-Avon Tithe Barn, a flower-like pattern of overlapping circles is incised into a stone in the wall. Similar marks of overlapping circles have been found on a window sill dated about 1616 at Owlpen Manor in Gloucestershire, as well as taper burn marks on the jambs of a medieval door frame.

The marks are most common near places where witches were thought to be able to enter, whether doors, windows or chimneys. For example, during works at Knole, near Sevenoaks in Kent, in 1609, oak beams beneath floors, particularly near fireplaces, were scorched and carved with scratched witch marks to prevent witches and demons from coming down the chimney.

Marks have been found in buildings including Knole House, Shakespeare's Birthplace in Stratford-upon-Avon, the Tower of London, and many churches. A collection of over 100 marks – previously thought to be graffiti – was discovered in 2019 on the walls of a cave network at Creswell Crags in Nottinghamshire. Gainsborough Old Hall has 20, the most of any English Heritage property, concentrated in the servant's quarters alongside curses about the owner William Hickman.

Jennifer Alexander, Professor of Architectural History at the University of Warwick, declared in 2026 that "there's no evidence that these are witches' marks" or that the marks have anything to do with witches or any "mystical meanings". She argued instead that they were "practices [for apprentices] for drawing on stone and learning how to use compasses with straight edges to do geometry."

=== Dreamcatchers ===
In Ojibwe culture, dreamcatchers woven like a spider's web are traditionally placed above an infant's cradle as a form of spiritual protection. In Lakota culture, dream catchers are believed to catch the good dreams that are blown around at night, so that they can then enter the sleeping person, while the bad dreams would pass through and burn up.

=== Others ===
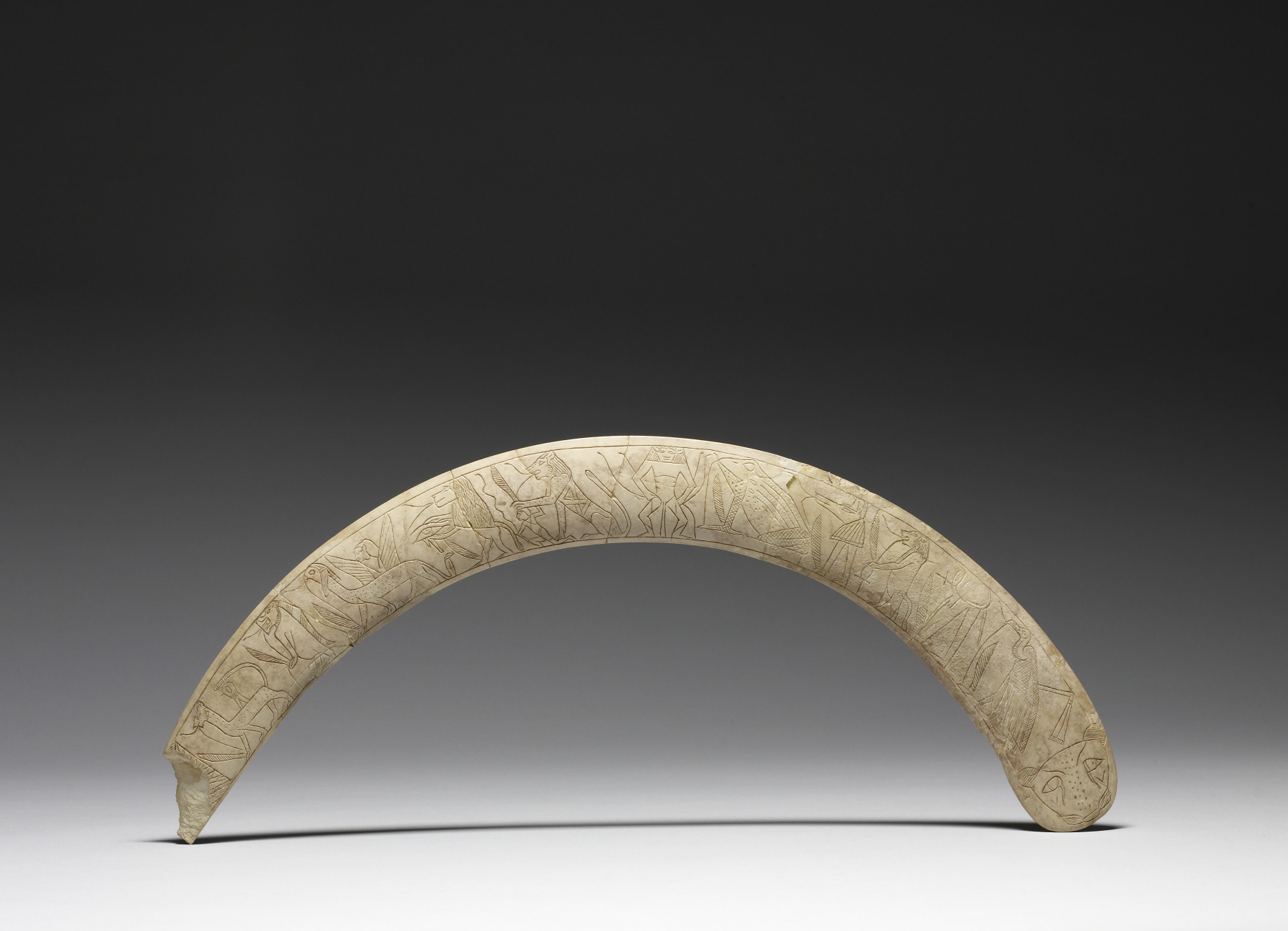
An ancient Egyptian apotropaic wand shows a procession of protective deities. It was used in birth rituals, perhaps to draw a magic circle around the mother and child.

Items and symbols such as crosses, crucifixes, wild roses and garlic were believed to ward off or destroy vampires.

In Mesopotamia, incantation bowls were used to ward off evil.

Peisistratus hung the figure of a kind of grasshopper before the Acropolis of Athens as apotropaic magic.

In Roman art, envy was thought to bring bad luck to the person envied. To avoid envy, Romans sought to incite laughter in their guests by using humorous images. Images such as large phalluses (see fascinus), deformities such as hunchbacks, or Pygmies and other non-Roman subjects were common. Romans saw deformity as comical and believed that such images could be used to deflect the evil eye.

In Europe, apotropaic figureheads carved onto the prow of sailing ships are considered to have been a replacement for the sacrifice of a thrall during the Age of Invasions by Saxon and Viking sailors, to avoid bad luck on the voyage. Dredging the Thames under London Bridge led to the discovery of a large number of bent and broken knives, daggers, swords and coins, from the modern period and dating back to Celtic times. This custom seems to have been to avoid bad luck, particularly when setting off on a voyage. Similarly, the burial of an old boot or shoe by the lintel of the back door of a house seems to have had a similar intention.

In Ireland and Great Britain, magpies are traditionally thought to bring bad luck. Many people repeat various rhymes or salutations to placate them. (Note: The children's TV series Magpie preserved these rhymes as its theme song into the 1970s.)

Projectile points, described in Pueblo oral traditions as sacred weapons created by lightning strikes and as objects with dual power (both to kill and to protect), are used as altar decorations, amulets, or attachments to cradle boards. Shells in these cultures are often perceived as materials that add magical powers to water and as instruments for ritual sprinkling.

== Rituals and actions ==
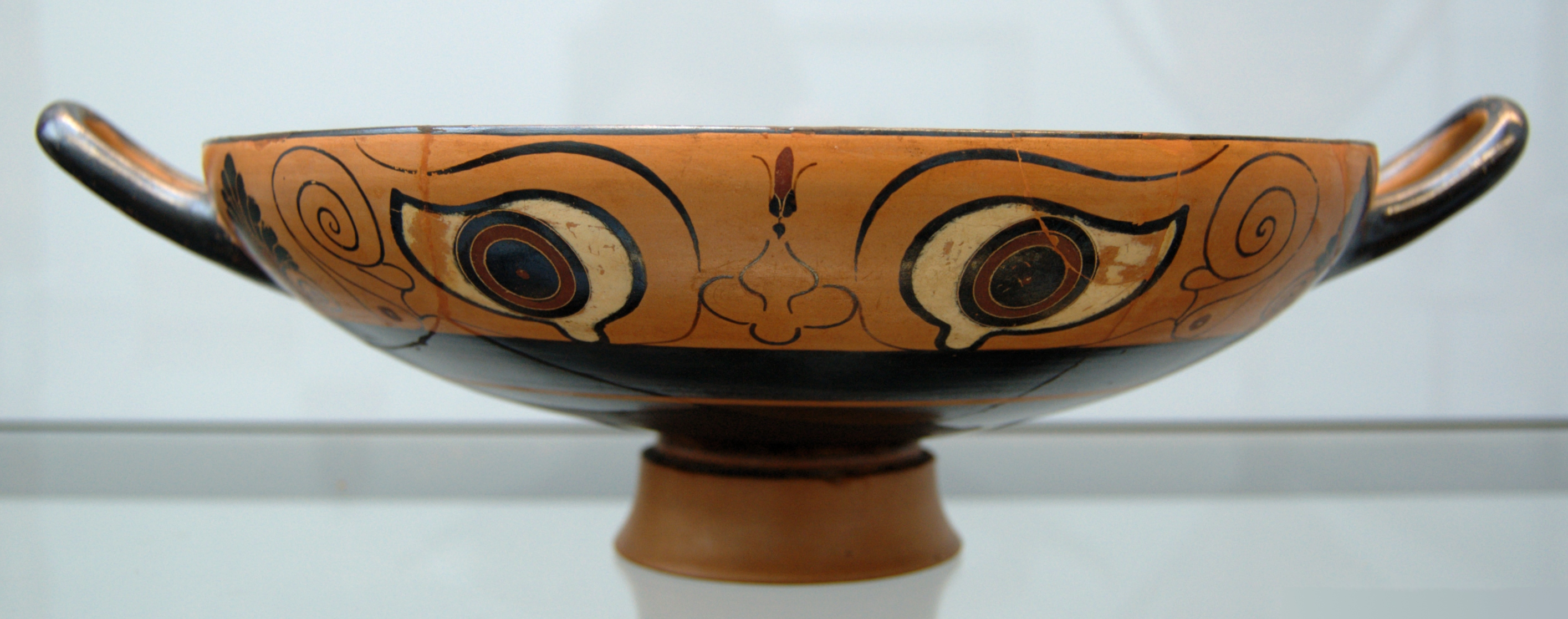
Chalcidian black-figured eye-cup, circa 530 BCE. Staatliche Antikensammlungen.

=== Spitting on clothes ===
Ancient Greeks and Romans used to spit into the folds of clothes as a way of protection from enchantment.

=== Dressing boys as girls ===
Ancient Greeks also had an old custom of dressing boys as girls in order to avert the evil eye. Achilles is said to have been dressed in his youth as a girl at the court of Lycomedes, king of Scyros in order to avert the evil eye.

=== Fire rituals ===
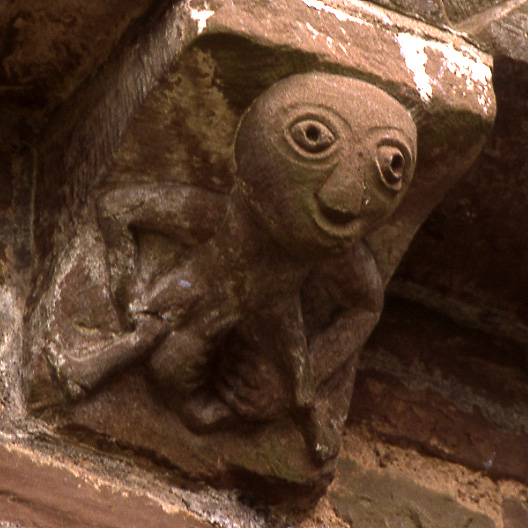
A 12th-century sheela na gig on the church at Kilpeck, Herefordshire

Fire was used in rituals of protection in many parts of Europe up to the early modern era. The need-fire or force-fire was a special fire kindled to ward off plague and murrain (infectious diseases affecting livestock) in parts of western, northern and eastern Europe. It could only be kindled by friction between wood, by a group of certain people, after all other fires in the area were doused. The livestock would be driven around the need-fire or over its embers, and all other fires would be re-lit from it. Two early medieval Irish texts say that druids used to drive cattle between two bonfires "with great incantations", to protect them from disease. Almost 1,000 years later, in the 19th century, the custom of driving cattle between two fires was still practiced across most of Ireland and parts of Scotland.

Also in Ireland and Scotland, bonfires were lit for the festivals Beltane and Samhain, and 18th–19th century accounts suggest the fires, smoke and ashes were deemed to have protective powers. In some areas, torches of burning fir or turf from the bonfire were carried sunwise around homes and fields to protect them. In central and northern Europe, bonfires lit on Walpurgis Night and at Midsummer were also believed to ward off evil.

In Southwestern cultures, burning materials and depositing ash are deemed to guard against witchcraft, which figures in all conceptualizations of trouble or disease. Fire is thought to weaken the spiritual potency of objects, while ash acts as a protective coating.

=== Magic circle ===
A magic circle is a circle of space marked out by practitioners of some branches of ritual magic, which they generally believe will contain energy and form a sacred space, or will provide them a form of magical protection, or both. It may be marked physically, drawn in a material like salt, flour, or chalk, or merely visualised.

=== Rites of passage ===
In the indigenous traditions of the American Southwest, ash, projectile points, crystals, and minerals are viewed as social actors, the anima of which can ward off witchcraft. These materials facilitate rites of passage—ceremonies dedicated to the change of social status of individuals, objects, or buildings—terminating the links either between the dead and the material world or between migrants and their current place of residence; specifically, protective magic is part of ritual closure of buildings (transition of their anima from one location or social role to another) and serves to guard residents and nomads from potential harm caused by unattended structures.

=== Dressing and feeding ancestors ===
Pueblo communities seek the spirits' favor and protection by using feathers, shells, turquoise, food, and items like rabbit sticks or weapons to clothe or feed ancestors, who are believed to appreciate such offerings.

== Apotropaic names ==
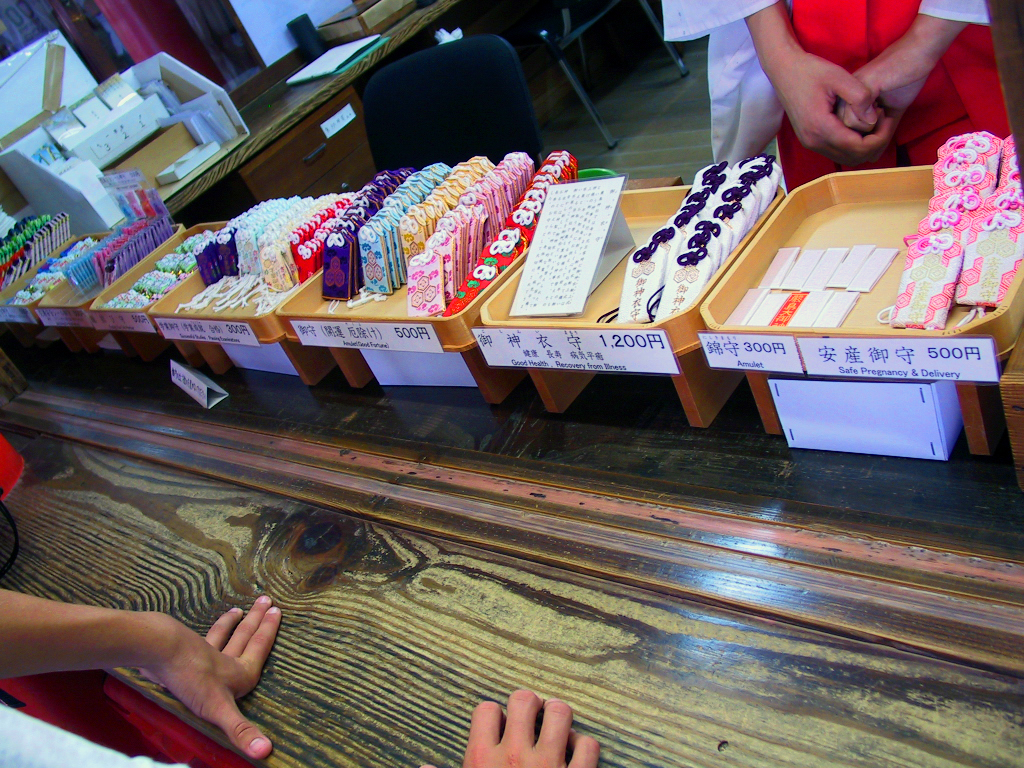
Amulets for specific purposes on sale at a Shinto shrine in Japan

Ashkenazi Jews' apotropaic names were often given not at birth but during serious illness. In the case of a family who had already lost a child, the parents may name the next child Alter and Alte (both meaning 'old' in Yiddish) in an effort to confuse the Angel of Death. Another example is Nekras (Некрас, 'not handsome' in Russian) which was given with the hope the child would be handsome.

Among Serbian names are many apotropaic names (zaštitna imena, 'protective names'), such as Vuk ('wolf') (and its many derivatives) and Staniša ('stone').

Historical Chinese given names sometimes had apotropaic meanings, such as in the case of Huo Qubing (霍 去病, Qubing 'away with illness'), or Xin Qiji (辛 棄疾, Qiji 'abandoning disease'). Some traditional Taiwanese names referred to domestic animals such as buffalo (水牛) and dog (狗, 犬), or humble elements of the landscape such as soil and water (土, 水). They conveyed contentment with a peaceful and low-profile life.

== See also ==
- Anasyrma
- Azusa yumi
- Cămașa ciumei
- Echinopsis pachanoi
- Exorcism
- Eyespot (mimicry)
- Hama yumi
- Hamsa
- Haint blue
- Hoko (doll)
- House blessing
- Incantation bowl
- Jack-o'-lantern
- Mezuzah
- Noa-name
- Ofuda
- Painted pebbles
- Pazuzu
- Peijainen
- Singa (mythology)
- Skandola
- Spiritual warfare
- Sympathetic magic
- Taper burn mark
- Witch window
- Zjarri
