= Witch window =

Window rotated 45° from vertical

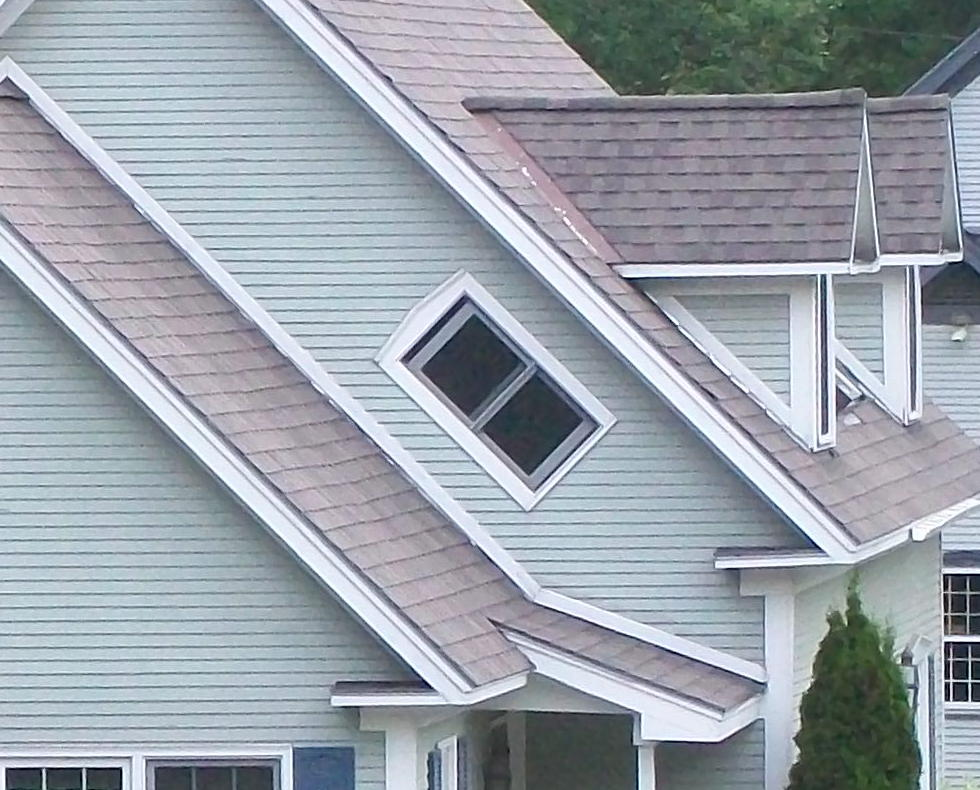
A Vermont or witch window

In American vernacular architecture, a witch window (also known as a Vermont window, among other names) is a window (usually a double-hung sash window, occasionally a single-sided casement window) placed in the gable-end wall of a house and rotated approximately 1/8 of a turn (45 degrees) from the vertical, leaving it diagonal, with its long edge parallel to the roof slope. This technique allows a builder to fit a full-sized window into the long, narrow wall space between two adjacent roof lines, where a window would not otherwise fit.

Witch windows are found almost exclusively in or near the U.S. state of Vermont, generally in the central and northern parts of the state. They are principally installed in farmhouses from the 19th century, and can be found less frequently in new construction.

== Etymology ==
The name "witch window" appears to come from a folk belief that witches cannot fly their broomsticks through the tilted windows, although it seems unlikely that the tale was taken seriously. The windows are also known as "coffin windows"; it is unclear if they were used for removing a coffin from the second floor (avoiding a narrow staircase), or if the odd placement on the wall were reminiscent of a coffin. Either explanation seems far-fetched. The windows are also known as "Vermont windows" for their distribution and as "sideways" or "lazy windows" for their orientation.

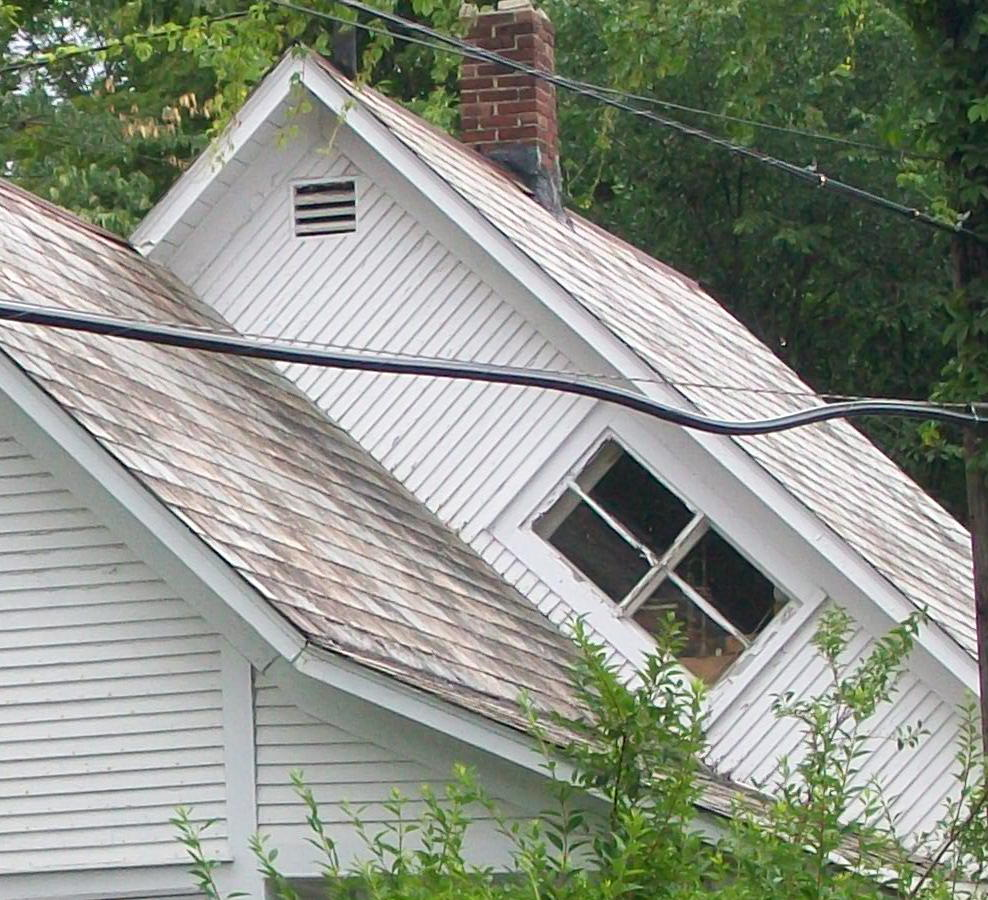
On this house, the clapboards are hung at an angle to match the window frame.

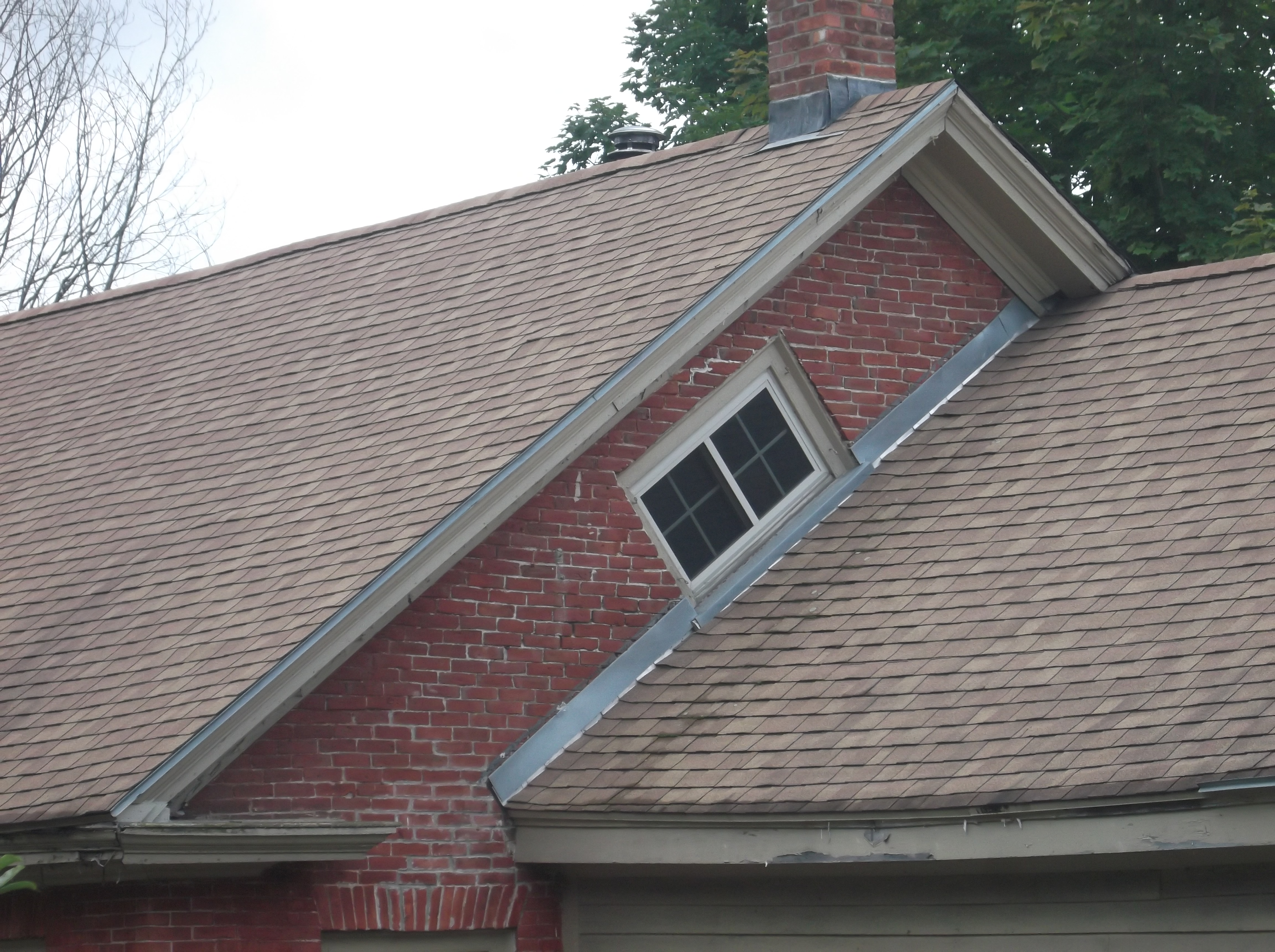
A very unusual example of a diagonal window set in a brick wall

== Construction ==
Dormer windows are unusual in Vermont, particularly in older construction; windows are mostly placed in walls. When a house is expanded, for example with a kitchen wing or an attached shed, there may be very little wall space available in the gable end in which to put a window, which may be the only window available for an upper floor room (if there is no dormer—adding a dormer to an existing roof is problematic, as it involves puncturing the roof membrane).

The solution is to rotate the window until its long edge is parallel to the nearby roof line, to better maximize the space available for a window. Thus, not only is the window area (and thus incoming light and ventilation) maximized, but building or buying a custom window is avoided.

An alternative explanation for the orientation of the window is that getting at least one corner of a window up as far as possible in the interior of the house allows hot air (which rises to the top of the room) to escape on summer afternoons. However, this reasoning seems suspect, as Vermont is not as hot as many other locations, where the windows are not ubiquitous. If heat escape were the goal, diagonal windows could be placed in other walls as well.

The slanted orientation of the window can complicate the placement of the siding (such as clapboards) on the wall in which the window is hung, because if the siding is horizontal, it will meet the window frame at an acute angle, complicating both the cutting of the siding and the waterproofing of the frame-siding joint. One solution is to orient all of the siding on the wall so that it is parallel with the window frame.

== In popular culture ==
- The Weird Window Brewing company, based in South Burlington, Vermont, was named for witch windows. One of the windows is depicted in the brewery's logo.

== See also ==
- Haint blue
- Witches' stones
- Fortochka
- Vernacular architecture
