= Indigo fingers =

Temporary body art

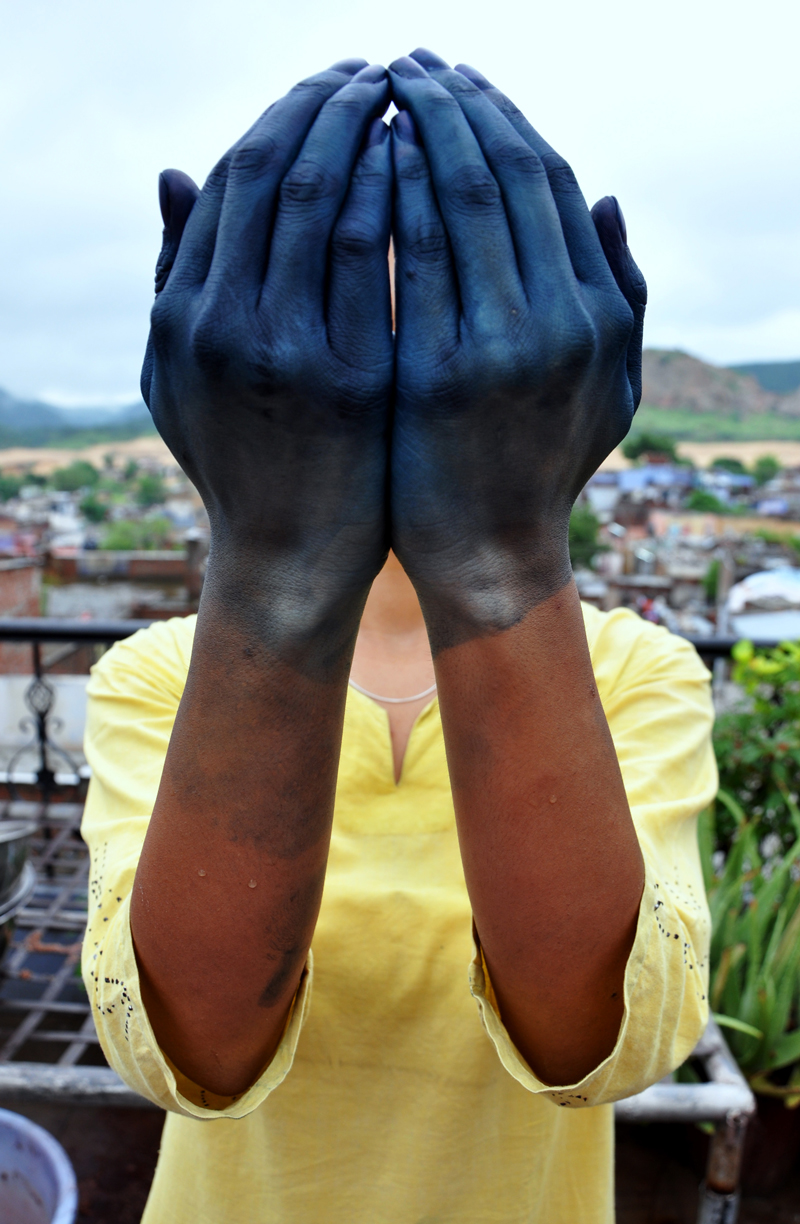
Indigo stained hands

Indigo fingers, also known as elukami, is a form of temporary body art and cultural expression that involves the application of indigo dye, derived from Indigofera, to the fingers, hands, or skin. The practice is described by its practitioners as a symbolic act of ancestral remembrance, cultural identity, and connection to historical traditions associated with indigo cultivation and dyeing.

Like other pigments, indigo dye is used in this body art in the Americas and resembles similar traditions of henna as body art found in North Africa, East Africa, the Middle East, and South Asia.

Contemporary practitioners describe the practice as both decorative and commemorative, particularly within cultural heritage observances. A popular celebration includes Juneteenth.

== Etymology ==
The term and tradition elukami was formally coined and practiced by a TikToker named Shay in around September 2025. Elukami is a neologism, based on the Yoruba word for indigo, ẹlu.

The term indigo fingers refers more broadly to the characteristic blue staining of the fingers that results from handling indigo dye. Historically, laborers involved in the cultivation, harvesting, and processing of indigo plants often developed temporary blue discoloration on their hands.

== History ==
=== Historical indigo traditions ===
Indigo is among the world's oldest natural dyes and has been used throughout Africa, Asia, Europe, and the Americas for thousands of years. Various species of indigo-producing plants were cultivated for textile production and ceremonial uses.

In regard to "indigo fingers", the tradition applies directly to descendants of enslaved Africans in the Americas, especially Gullah–Geechee. During the colonial period in the Americas, indigo became a major cash crop. Indigo plantations relied heavily on the labor of enslaved Africans. The dyeing process involved harvesting, fermenting, processing, and drying indigo into a concentrated pigment used for coloring textiles. Indigo was cultivated in the Caribbean, then transplanted to South Carolina and North Carolina where people of the Tuscarora confederacy adopted the dyeing process for head wraps and clothing. Exports of the crop expanded in the mid-to late 18th century. It comprised more than one-third of all exports in value.

=== Contemporary development ===
Indigo dye is largely synthetically produced in the 21st Century.

In contemporary practice, Indigo fingers has been described as a form of cultural expression that combines body art, storytelling, and ancestral commemoration. Practitioners may use indigo staining as a symbolic acknowledgment of historical labor, resilience, and cultural continuity. The human labor involved in indigo dye production often left stains on the producer's body, especially hands. The practice is often described as a modern remembrance tradition inspired by the historical relationship between African-descended communities and the indigo industry and pigment.

== Process ==
Indigo fingers typically involves preparing the natural indigo dye mixture (like jagua gel) and applying it directly to the skin.

Application methods may include:

- Finger staining
- Hand painting
- Symbolic markings
- Decorative patterns

After application, the dye temporarily stains the skin blue. The intensity and duration of the stain depend on the concentration of the dye, skin type, and length of contact.

As with other temporary body art traditions, the coloration gradually fades over time.

== Usage ==
Indigo fingers is a ceremonial art form common in the United States. It is a beloved tradition during cultural heritage celebrations, community gatherings, ancestral remembrance ceremonies, educational events, artistic performances, and even privately.

The practice may serve as a visible reminder of cultural traditions that connect present generations with historical experiences (like the symbolic usage of Sankofa in African American contexts).

== Popular designs and motifs ==
Designs associated with Indigo fingers vary among practitioners.

Common motifs may include:

- Geometric patterns
- Textile-inspired designs
- Symbols associated with African diasporic cultures (like Adinkra symbols)
- Family or community emblems
- Nature-inspired imagery
- Historical symbols (like pertaining to the Underground Railroad)

Unlike some highly standardized body-art traditions, there is currently no widely documented canonical set of Indigo finger designs.

== See also ==
- Gullah–Geechee traditions
- Body painting
- Temporary tattoo
- Henna
- Mehndi
- Haint blue
