= Taper burn mark =

Scorch marks on early modern house beams

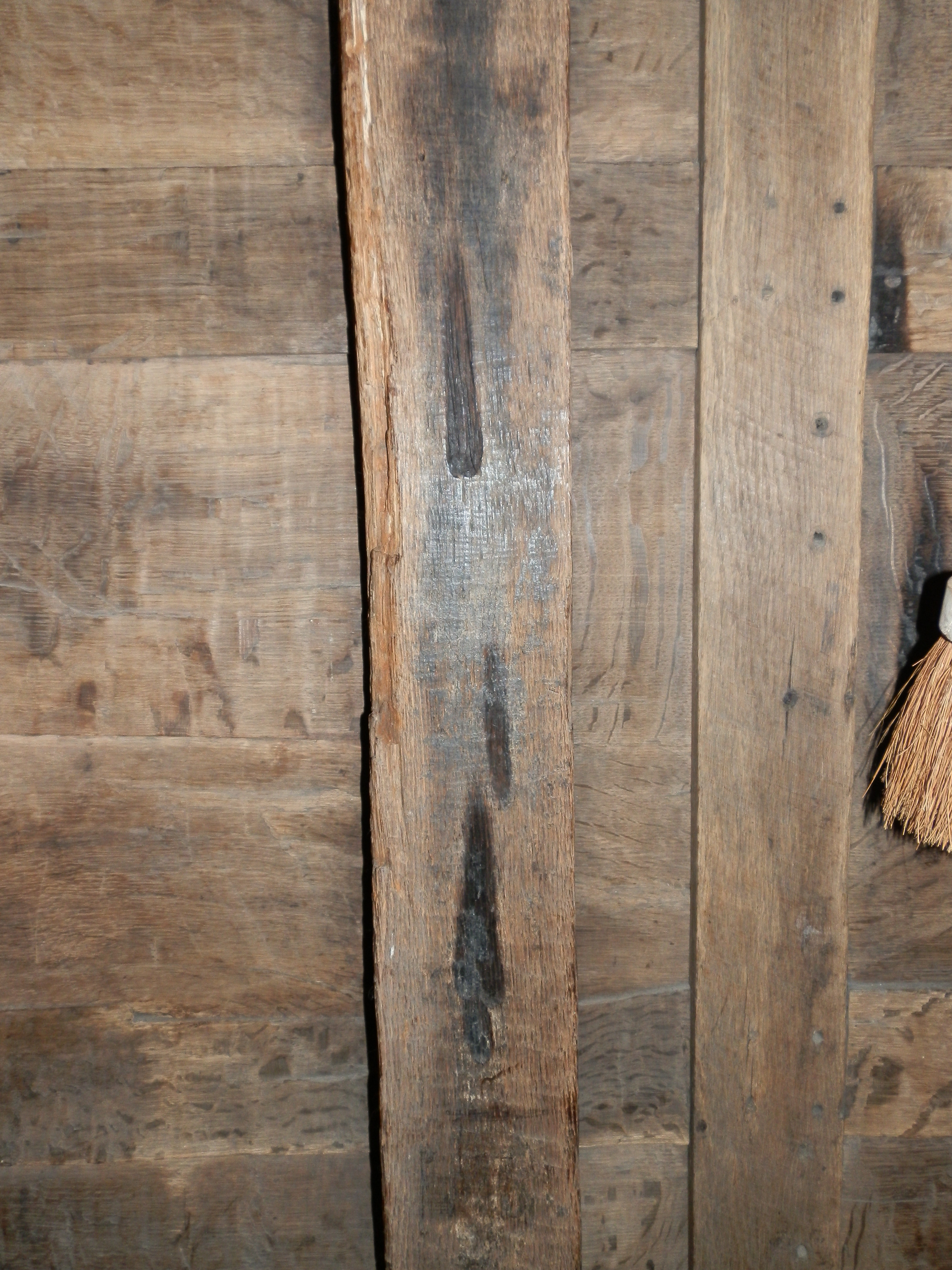
Taper burn marks in Haddon Hall, England.

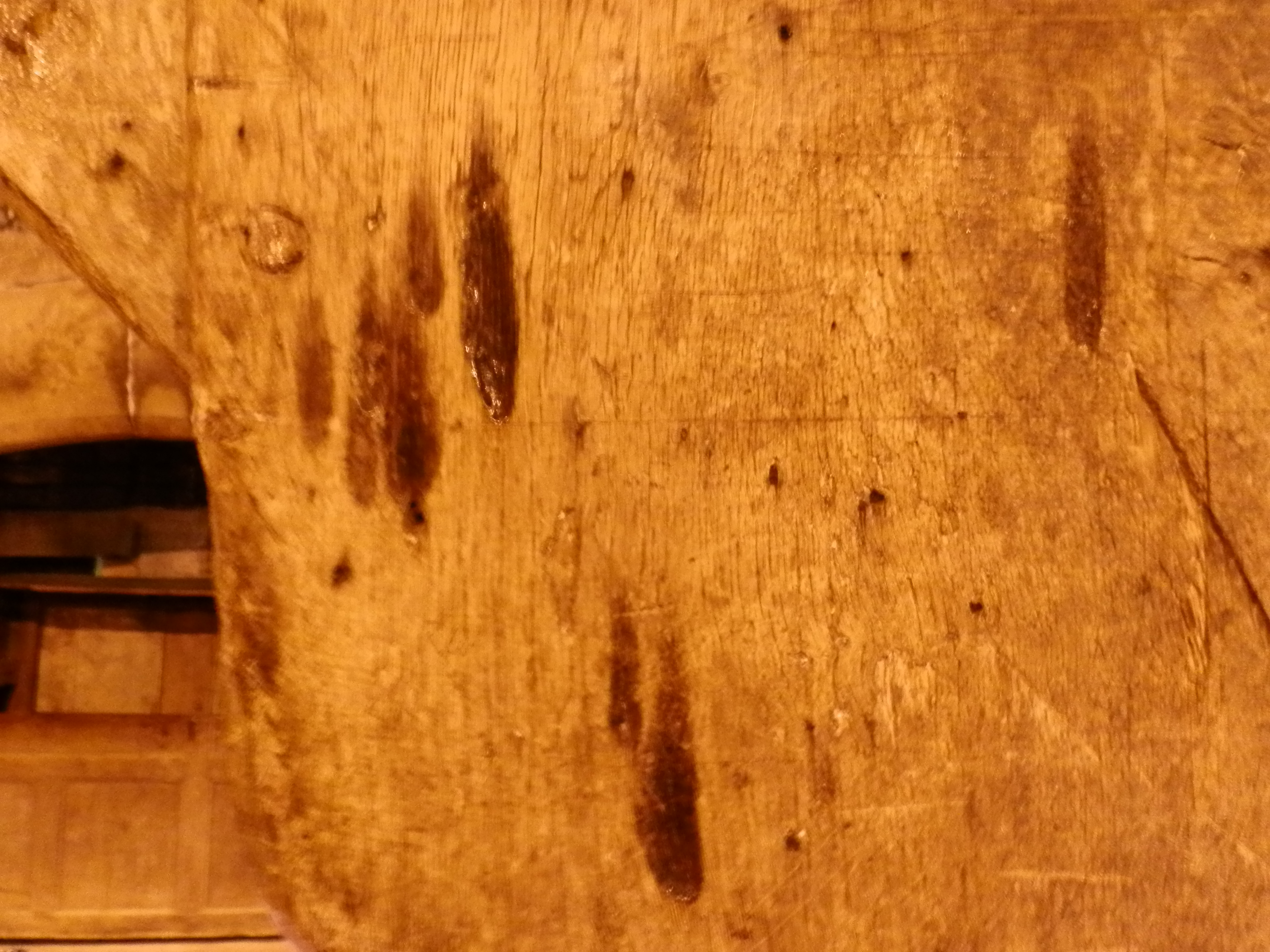
Taper burn marks in Haddon Hall, England.

Taper burn marks are deep flame shaped scorch marks often found on the timber beams of early modern houses. They were once thought to have been accidental scorches from taper candle, but research suggests that most marks may have been made deliberately, as there is clear patterning to the activity. They are theorised to have been made as part of a folk superstition, then thought to protect the building from fire and lightning.

They are often found around entrances to the home such as fireplaces, doors and windows.

Over 80 such marks have been discovered in the Tower of London.

== See also ==
- Apotropaic mark
- Haint blue
