= Fortochka =

Small ventilation window, mostly found in Russia

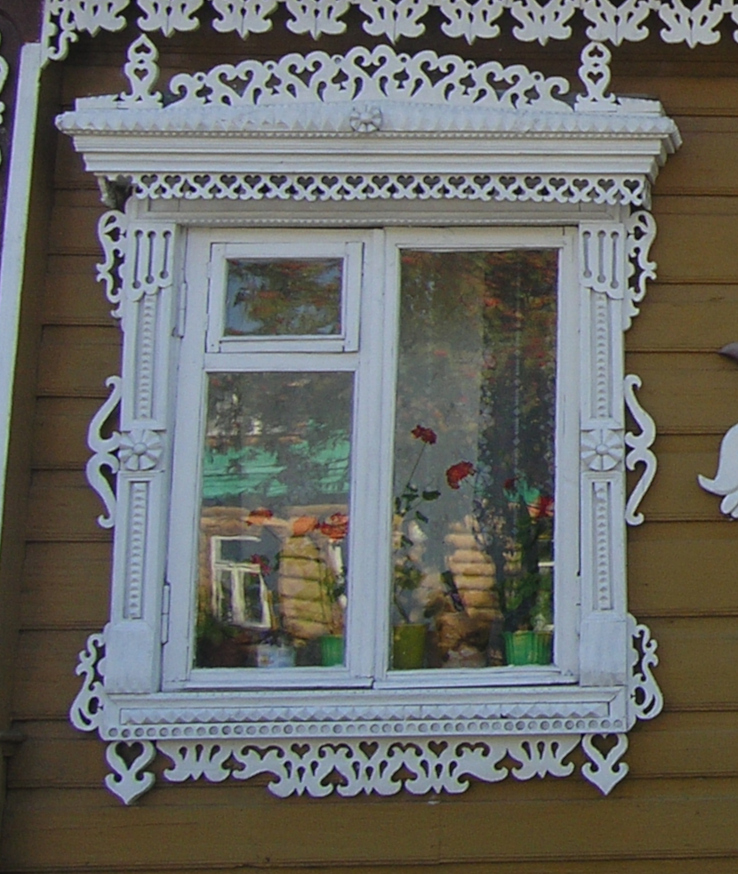
A window with a fortochka (in the upper left corner)

A fortochka (Russian: фо́рточка, IPA: [ˈfortətɕkə]) is a small ventilation window generally not greater than 35x45 cm. It usually spans the frame of one window pane and opens on hinges independently of the whole window. Fortochkas are in common use in Russia, other post-Soviet states (Ukrainian: кватирка, kvatyrka), and Finland (Finnish: tuuletusikkuna).

A fortochka can be used for ventilation during cold winters, when opening a whole window would be impractical for heat conservation purposes.

The window was designed by Italian architect Francesco Bartolomeo Rastrelli for the Winter Palace in St. Petersburg in 1754.

== Cultural significance ==
The true origin of the word appears to be lost, but its nearest relative appears to be the German pforte, for "gate" or "gap". Someone referred to as a "fortochnik" is a criminal specializing in the challenging art of sneaking into and out of a fortochka. In the realm of dream interpretation, fortochkas have at least four roles – a broken one indicates a wasted effort; a dusty one indicates someone is spreading ill rumors about you; if you look through one, your dreams will come true; if you open one, your life will take a positive turn.

== See also ==
- Sash window – Window made of one or more movable panels
- Transom (architecture) – Horizontal structural piece separating a door from a window above it
- Wicket gate – Pedestrian door or gate
