= Staniša =

Staniša (Serbian Cyrillic: Станиша) is a Serbian masculine given name, derived from Slavic root stan and suffix -iša. It was traditionally given as an apotropaic (protective) name, when children often died, or when many children were born. It has been used in Serbian society since the Middle Ages. It may refer to:

- Staniša Mandić (born 1995), footballer
- Staniša Radmanović (born 1940), sprint canoer
- Staniša Radonjić (died c. 1720), orthodox priest and military commander
- Staniša Stošić (1945–2008), singer
- Stanisha (son of Gjon Kastrioti), the brother of Skanderbeg

== See also ==
- Stanišić (disambiguation)

== Sources ==
- Grković, Milica (1977). Rečnik ličnih imena kod Srba. Belgrade: Vuk Karadžić.
