= Cowroid =

Ancient Egyptian amulet

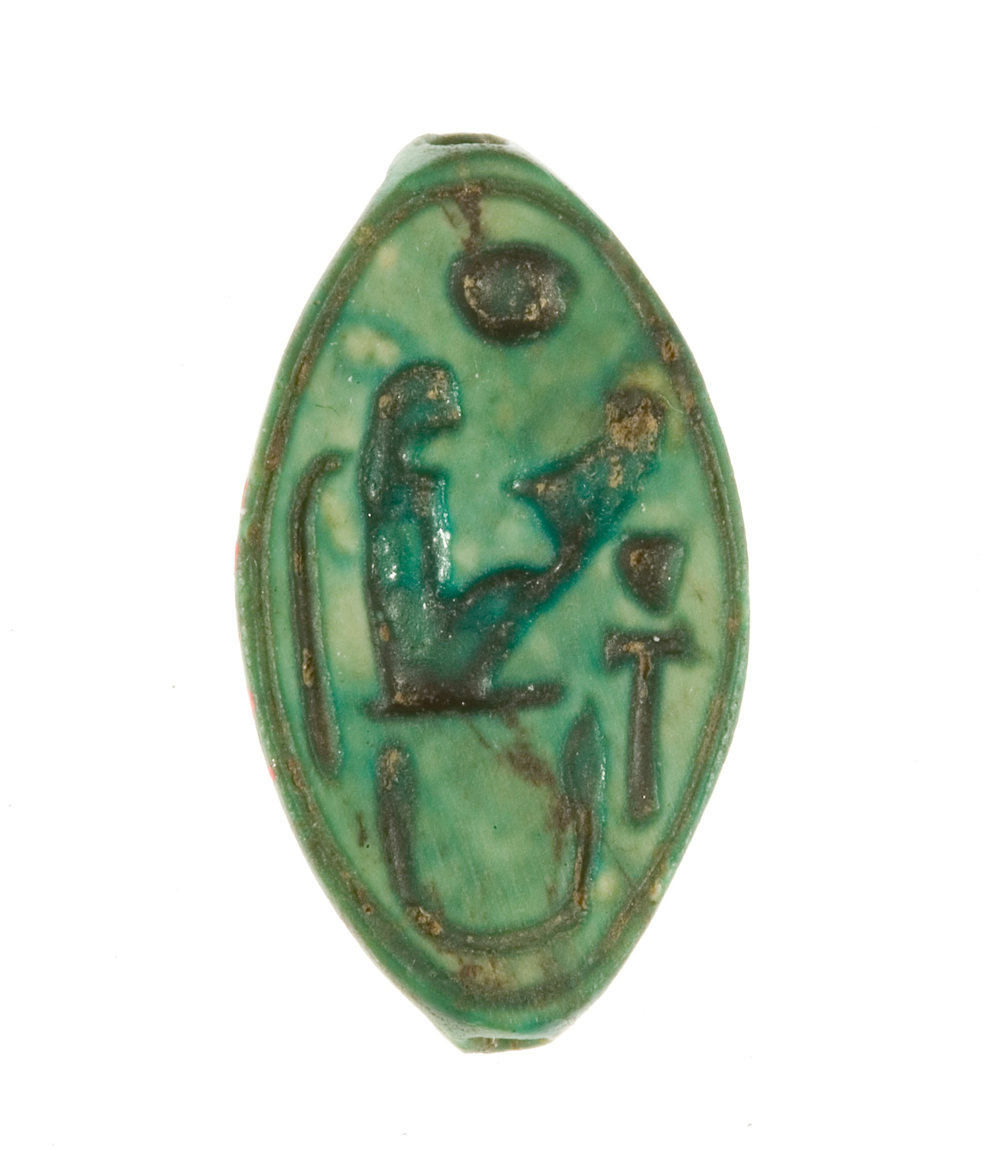
Cowroid seal inscribed for Hatshepsut (1479–1458 B.C.), Met Museum

The cowroid (or cauroid) was an ancient Egyptian seal-amulet that imitated the cowrie shell.

== Use ==
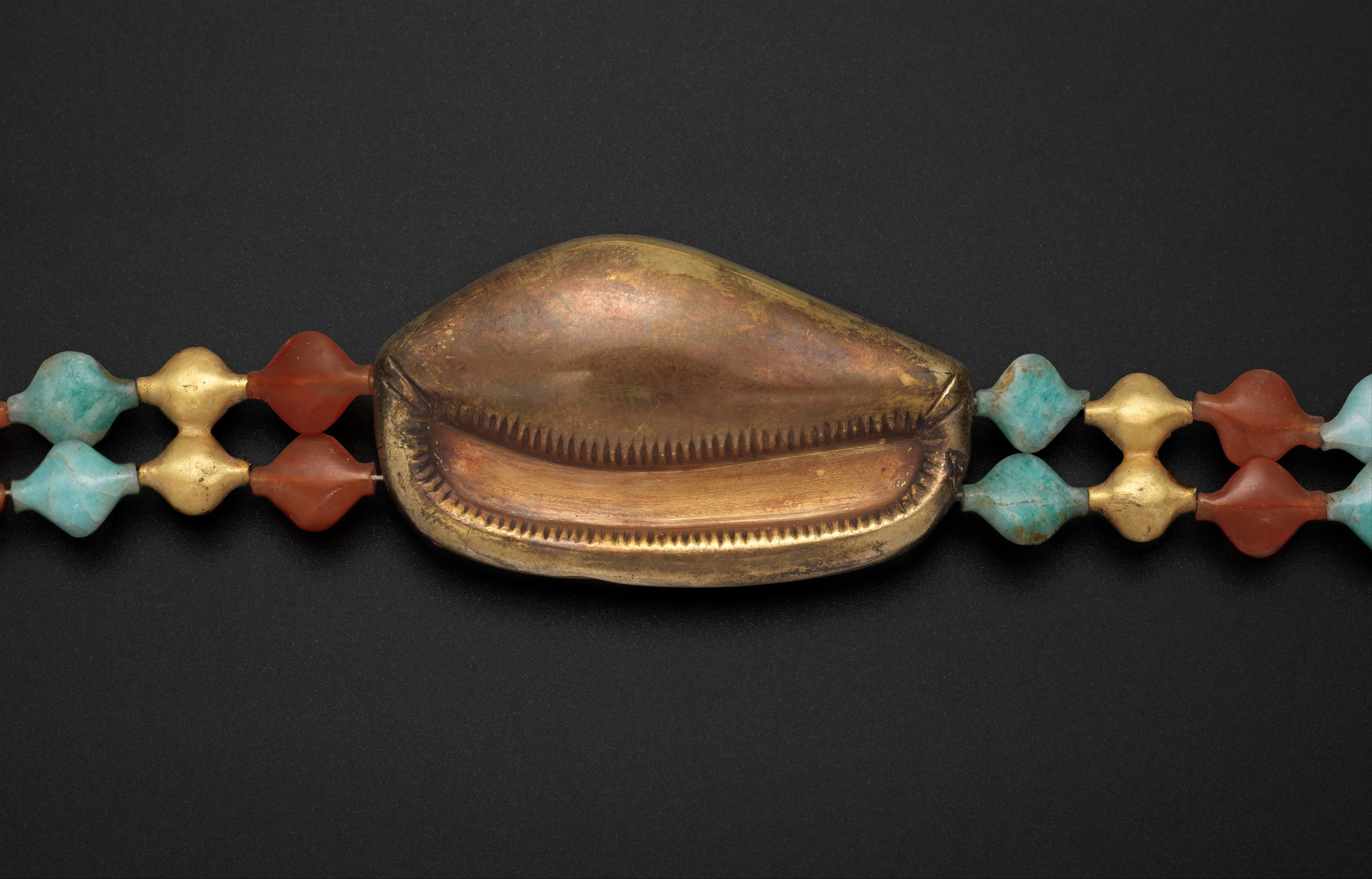
Cowroid girdle amulet (with a ventral opening) belonging to Sithathoriunet (1887–1813 B.C.), MET

Incorporated in a woman's girdle, cowroids served an apotropaic purpose, protecting her reproductive organs from malign forces, particularly during pregnancy.

== History ==
In Pre-dynastic Egypt and Neolithic Southern Levant, cowrie shells were placed in the graves of young girls. The modified Levantine cowries were discovered ritually arranged around the skull in female burials. During the Bronze Age, cowries became more common as funerary goods, also associated with burials of women and children.

=== Dynastic Egypt ===
From the late Old Kingdom onwards, cowrie shells were being imitated in blue-glazed composition and other semi-precious stones, with gold and silver examples known from the Middle Kingdom. As time progressed, they corrupted into a simple back design devoid of a ventral opening and were usually inscribed. Cowroids were commonly used during the Middle Kingdom, the Second Intermediate period, the 18th and 19th Dynasties, and the Saitic period.

== Gallery ==
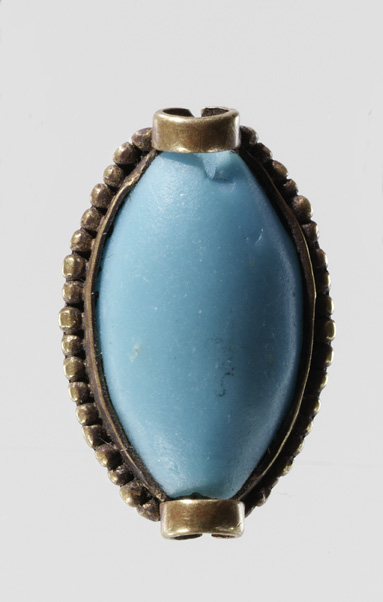
Pale blue glass cowroid, 18th Dynasty

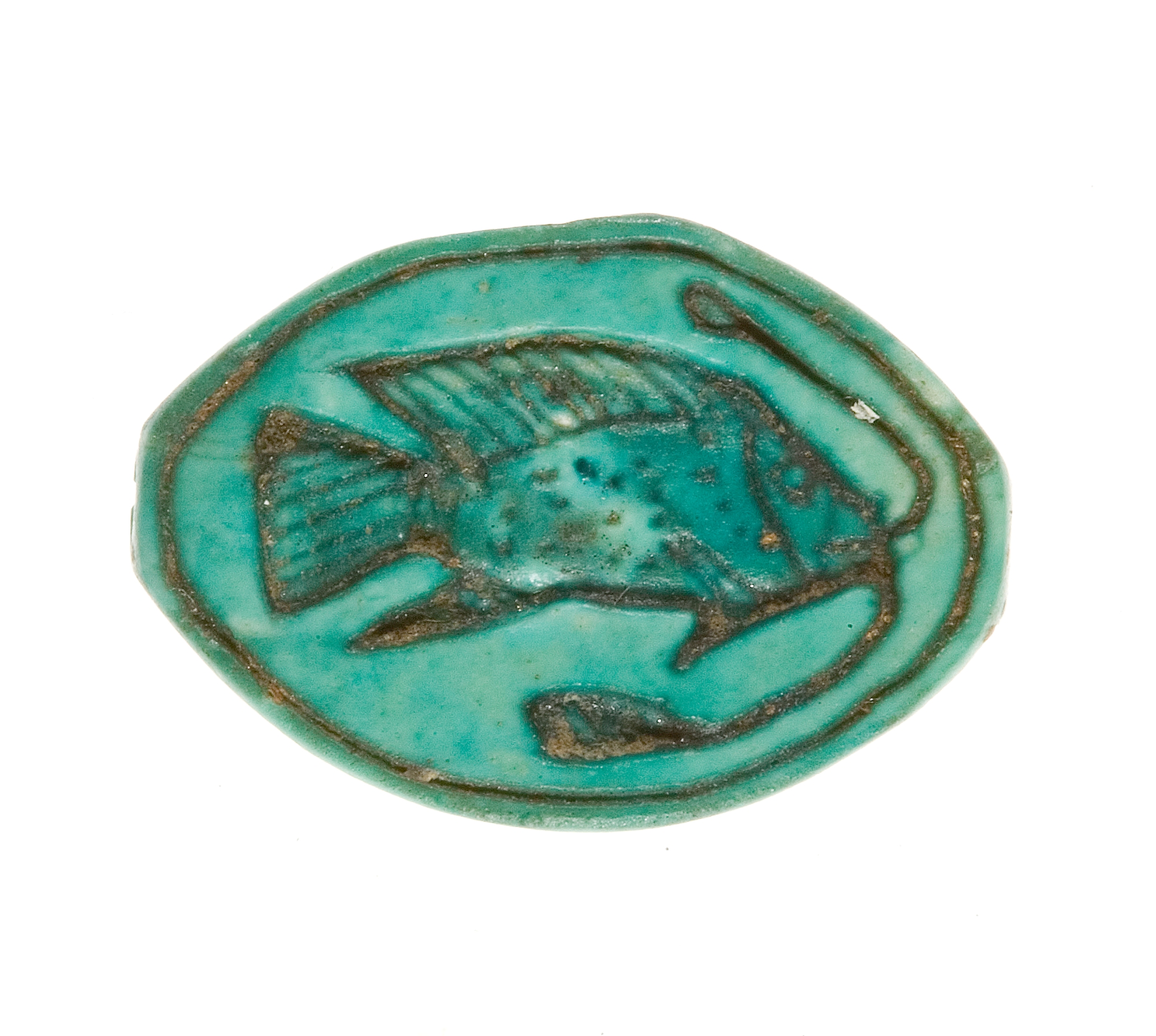
Cowroid seal amulet inscribed with a Bolti fish

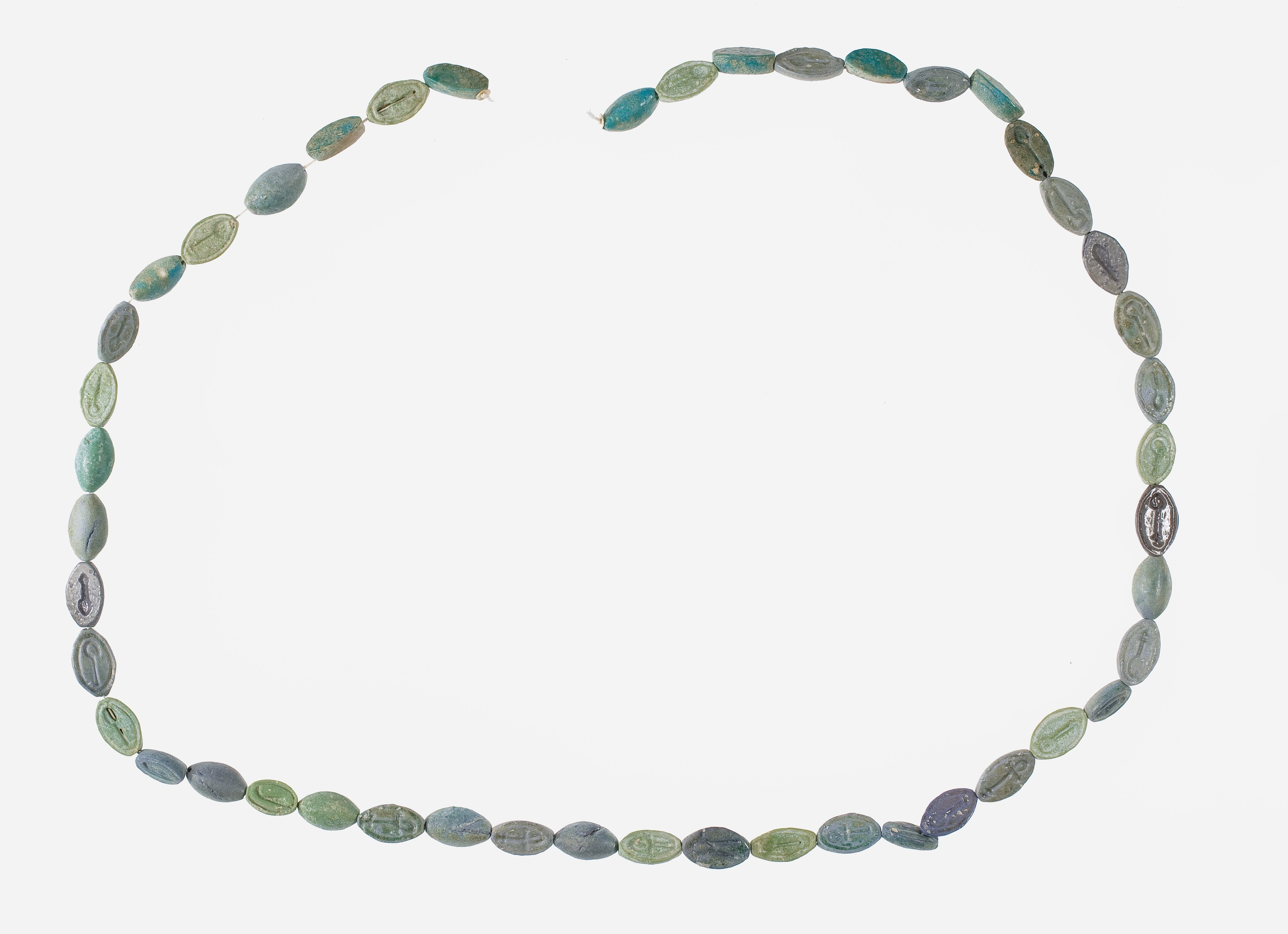
String of 46 cowroids inscribed with various hieroglyphs

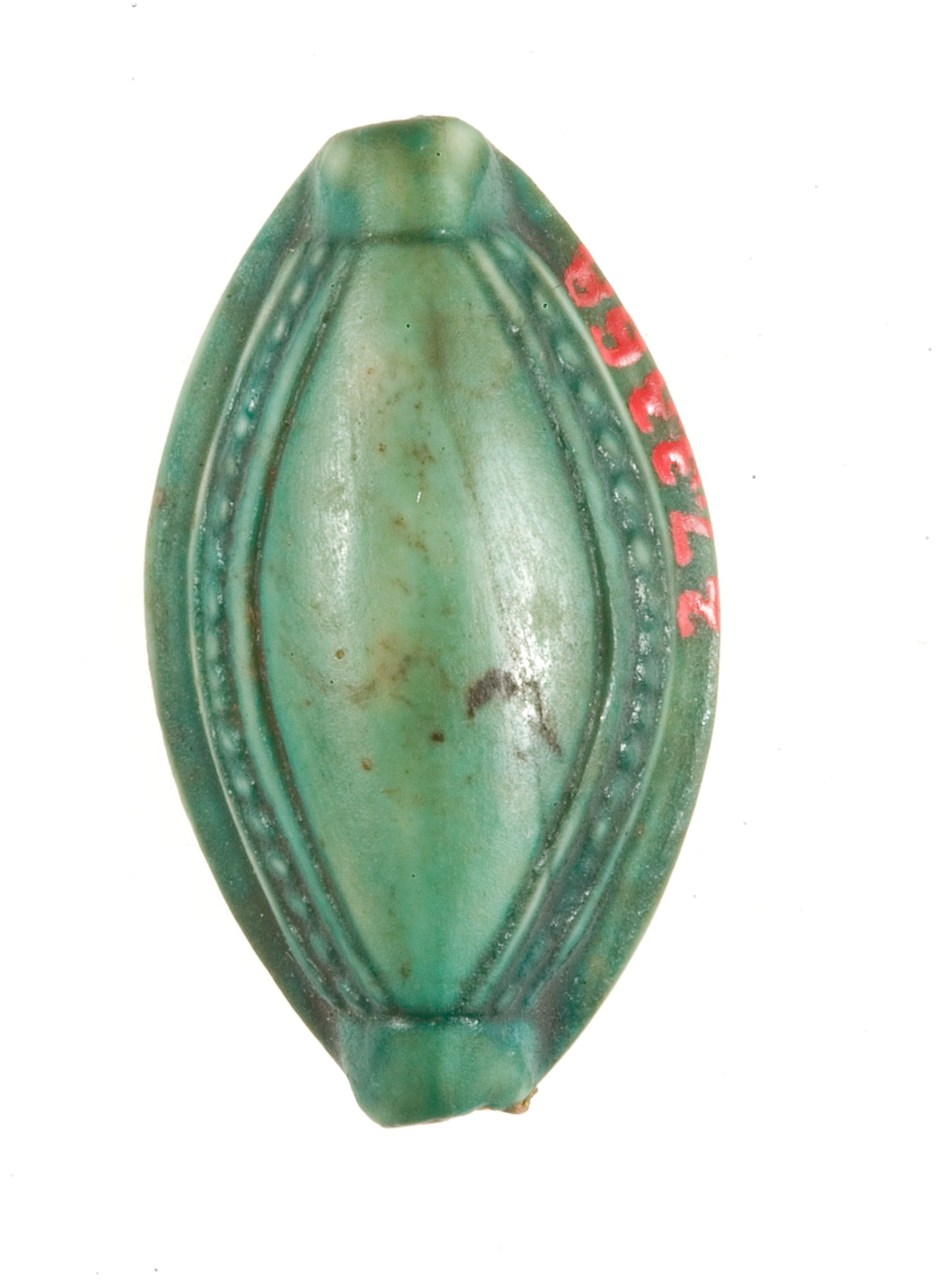
Cowroid seal amulet inscribed with a decorative pattern

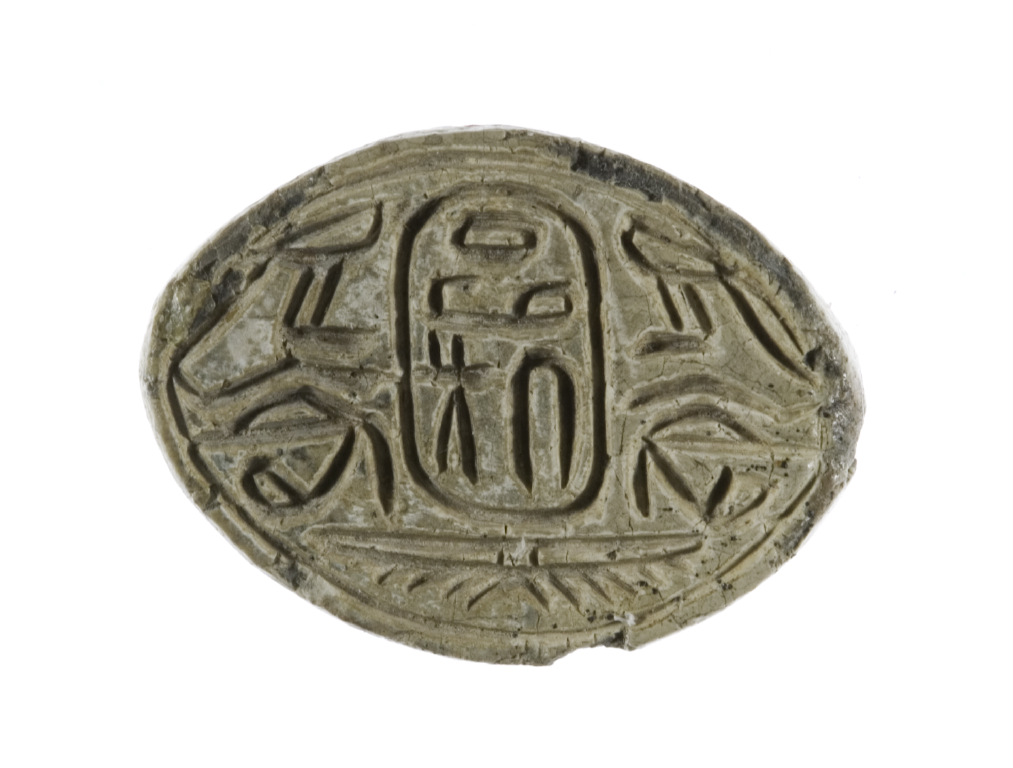
Cowroid steatite seal amulet with the name of the Hyksos King Apepi

== See also ==
- Scarab (artifact)
