= Stanišić =

Stanišić may refer to:

- Stanišić, Serbia, a village near Sombor
- Stanišić (surname), a Serbo-Croatian surname
