= Stanišić (surname) =

Stanišić is a surname found among Serbs, Montenegrins and Croats.

Notable people with the name include:

- Božidar Stanišić, Montenegrin water polo player
- Dany Stanišić, Serbian sailor
- Josip Stanišić, Croatian football player
- Jovica Stanišić, Serbian intelligence officer
- Lazar Stanišić, Serbian football player
- Mićo Stanišić, Bosnian Serb politician
- Petar Stanišić, Montenegrin football player
- Saša Stanišić, Bosnian German writer
- Strahinja Stanišić, Serbian alpine skier
- Vojislav Stanišić, Serbian American football player

== See also ==
- Staniša
