= Transom (architecture) =

Horizontal structural piece separating a door from a window above it

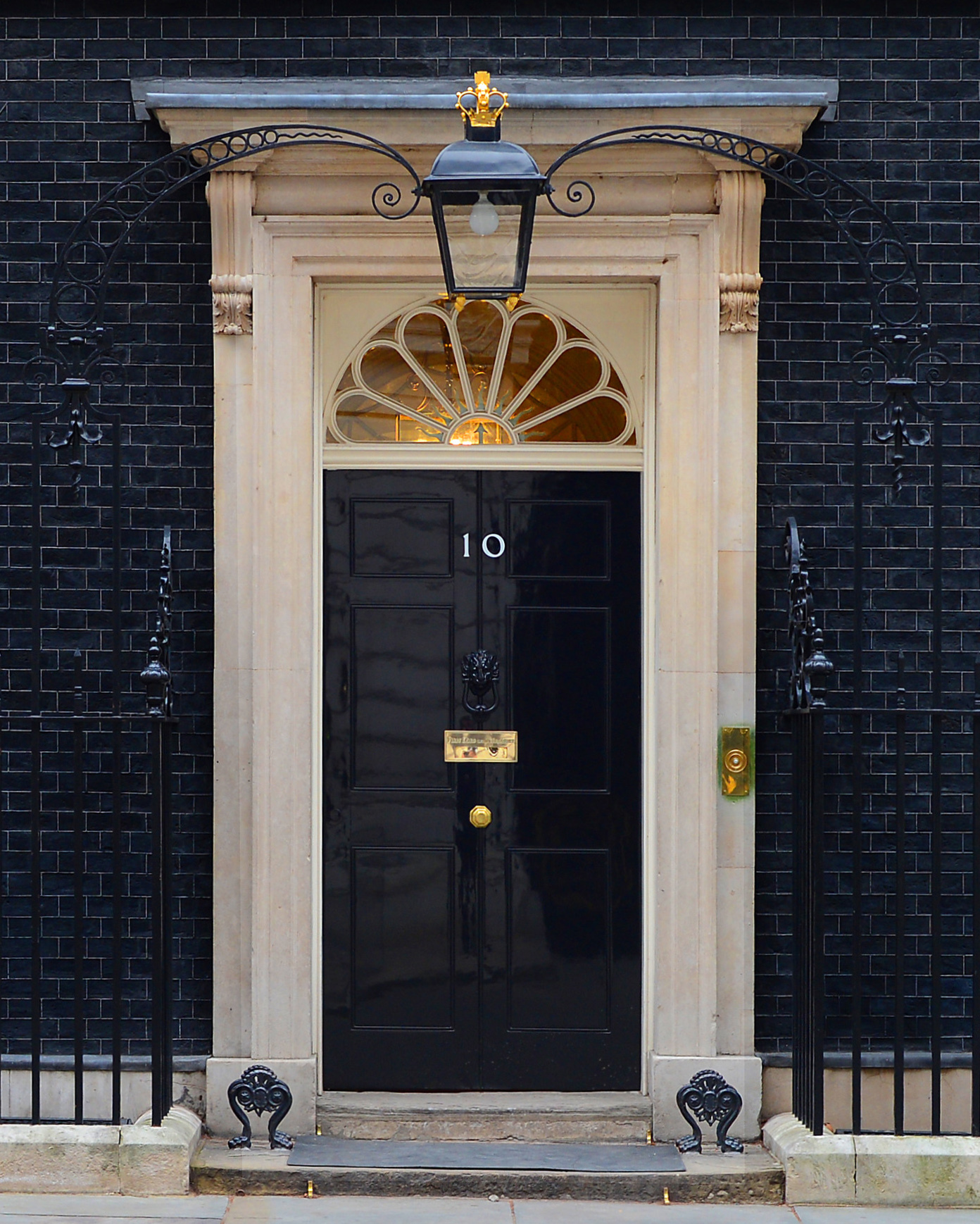
Door of 10 Downing Street, London, showing a transom separating the door from the fanlight window above

Parts of a casement cross-window, viewed from the outside

In architecture, a transom is a transverse horizontal structural beam or bar, or a crosspiece separating a door from a window above it. (This contrasts with a mullion, a vertical structural member.) Transom or transom window is also the customary U.S. word used for a transom light, the window over such a crosspiece.

Speakers of British English usually call such a transom light a "fanlight". (Note: Compare British English and American English usage.) Fanlights often have a semi-circular shape, especially when the window is segmented like the slats of a folding hand-fan. A prominent example of this occurs at the main entrance of 10 Downing Street, the official residence of the Prime Minister of the United Kingdom.

== History ==
In early Gothic ecclesiastical work, transoms are found only in belfry unglazed windows or spire lights, where they were deemed necessary to strengthen the mullions in the absence of the iron stay bars, which in glazed windows served a similar purpose. In the later Gothic, and more especially the Perpendicular Period, the introduction of transoms became common in windows of all kinds.

== Function ==
Transom windows which could be opened to provide cross-ventilation while maintaining security and privacy (due to their small size and height above floor level) were a common feature of apartments, homes, office buildings, schools, and other buildings before central air conditioning and heating became common beginning in the early-to-mid 20th century.

In order to operate opening transom windows, they were generally fitted with transom operators, a sort of wand assembly. In industrial buildings, transom operators could use a variety of mechanical arrangements.

== Idiomatic usage ==
The phrase "over the transom" refers to works submitted for publication without being solicited. The image evoked is of a writer tossing a manuscript through the open window over the door of the publisher's office.

Similarly, the phrase is used to describe the means by which confidential documents, information or tips were delivered anonymously to someone who is not officially supposed to have them.

Some such phrases may refer instead to the transom of a ship – large waves from behind can bring water over the transom.

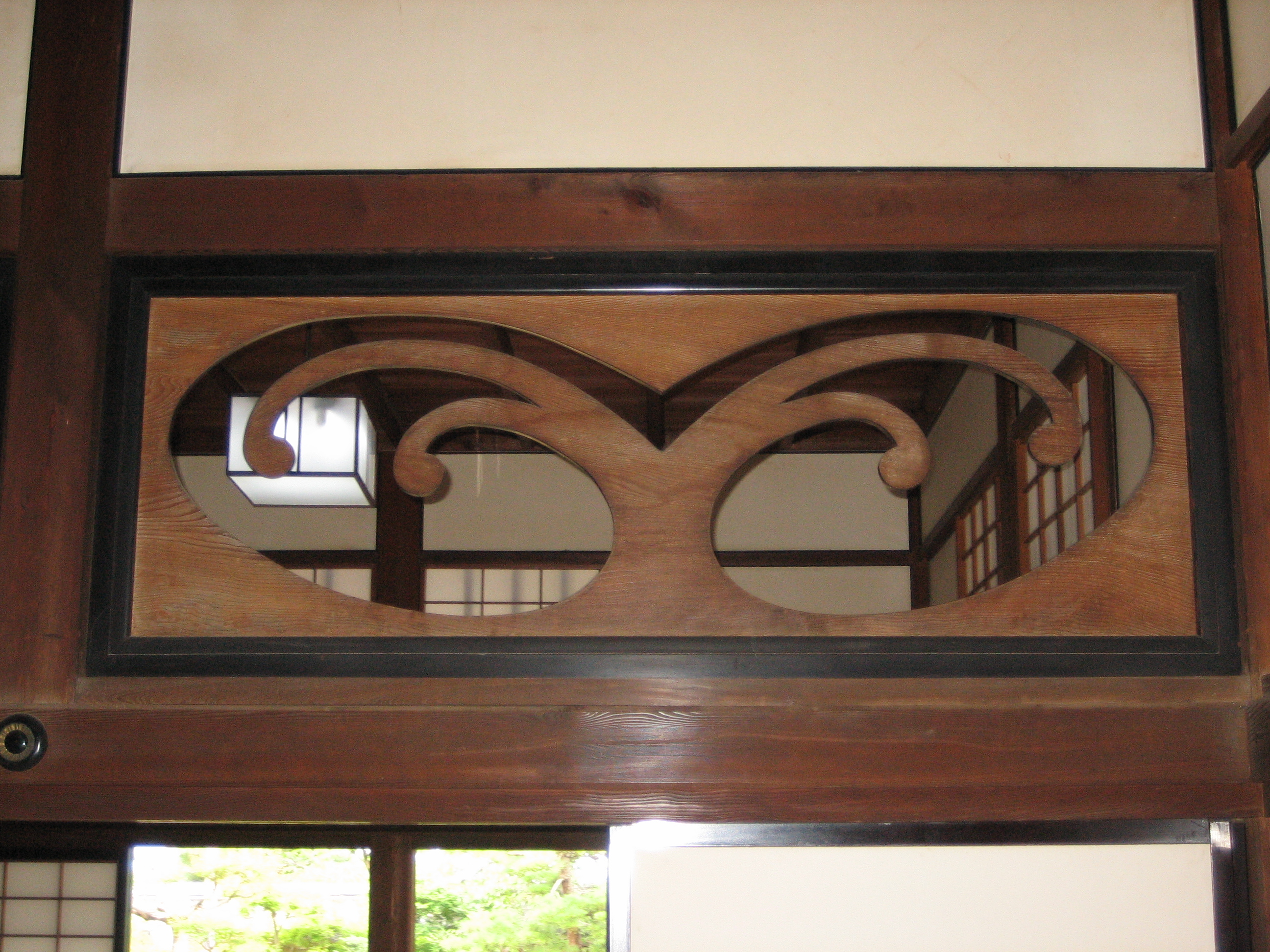
A ranma found in Kōchi Castle designed to look like a wave

"Like pushing a piano through a transom" is a folk idiom used to describe something exceedingly difficult; its application to childbirth (and possibly its origin) has been attributed to Alice Roosevelt Longworth and Fannie Brice.

== By country ==
=== France ===
In French, a transom window is called an imposte. The term vasistas (previously spelled wass-ist-dass), from a misunderstanding of the German was ist das? lit. 'what is that?', refers to any single pane within a door or window sash which is hinged independently to provide discrete ventilation without opening the entire sash.

=== Japan ===
Architectural details called ranma (欄間) are often found above doors in traditional Japanese buildings.

These details can be anything from simple shōji-style dividers to elaborate wooden carvings, and they serve as a traditional welcome to visitors of the head of the household.

== See also ==
- Fortochka
- Roof lantern
- Sidelight
- Skylight
