= Haint blue =

Shade of blue

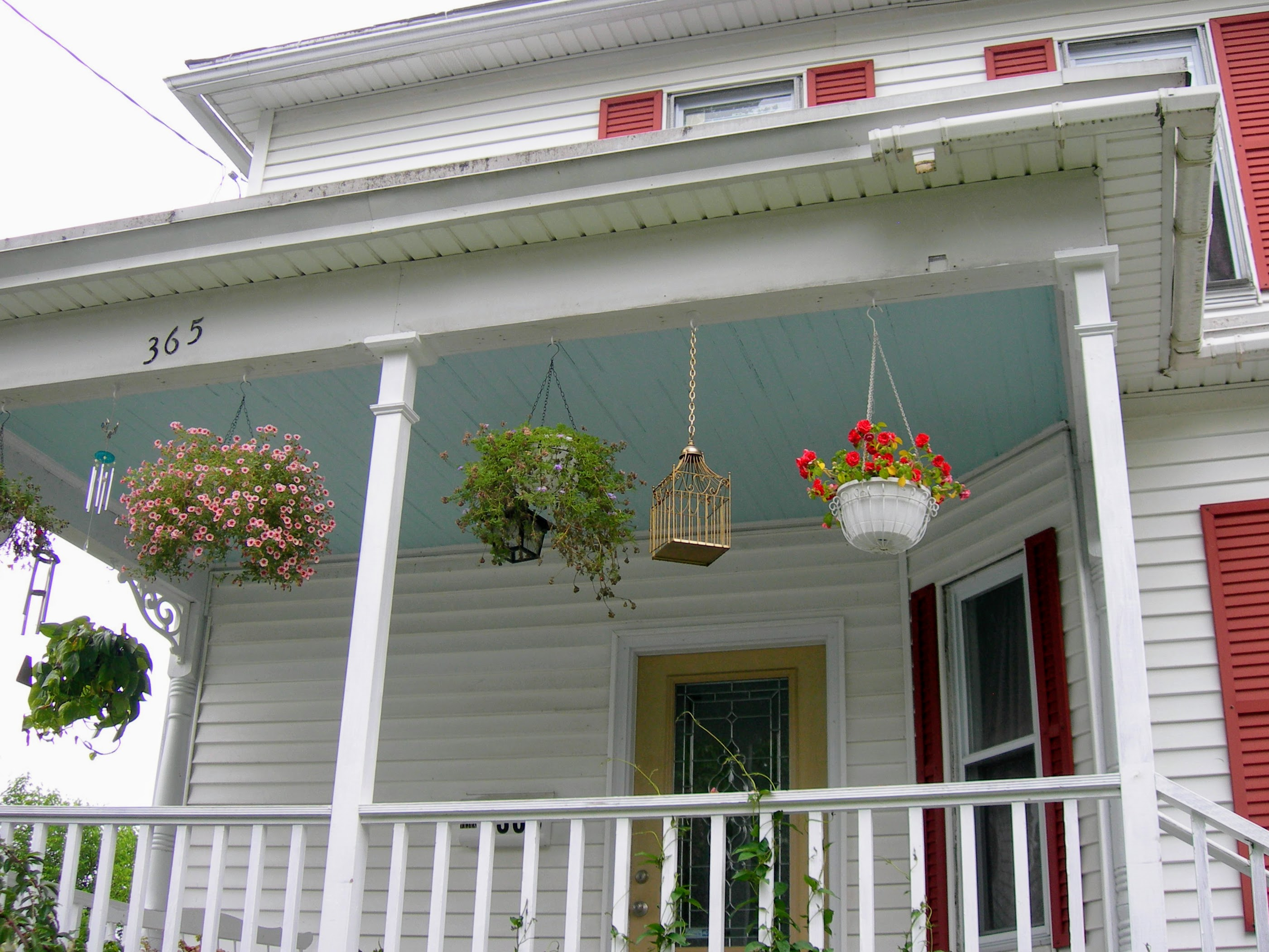
A haint blue porch ceiling in the United States

Example of a shade of haint blue
#D1EAEB

Haint blue is a collection of pale shades of blue-green that are traditionally used to paint porch ceilings in the Southern United States.

The tradition originated with the Gullah in Georgia and South Carolina. The ceiling of the slave quarters at the Owens–Thomas House in Savannah, Georgia, built in the early 19th century, was painted haint blue. The pigment was derived from crushed indigo plants. Indigo was a common source for haint blue prior to the American Revolution, when indigo was a common crop for plantations in the American South, but the tradition survived well after the decline in indigo dye cultivation.

== Etymology ==
The word haint is an alternative spelling of haunt, which was historically used in African-American vernacular to refer to a ghost or, in the Hoodoo belief, a witch-like creature seeking to chase victims to their death by exhaustion.

== Cultural significance and modern usage ==
=== Gullah culture ===
Originally, haint blue was thought by the Gullah to ward haints, or ghosts, away from the home. The tactic was intended either to mimic the appearance of the sky, tricking the ghost into passing through, or to mimic the appearance of water, which ghosts traditionally could not cross. The Gullah would paint not only the porch, but also doors, window frames, and shutters. Blue glass bottles were also hung in trees to trap haints and boo hags.

As Gullah culture was forcibly mingled with white southern culture, the custom became more widely practiced.

Additionally, not all Gullah identify with the belief that haint blue can ward off evil spirits, but the historical significance of indigo crops still applies. Many enslaved Africans of the Lowcountry and their descendants believed in the protective power of haint blue, but the cultivation of indigo as a cash crop in colonial South Carolina to produce the dye also significantly depended on labor from the 18th-century transatlantic slave trade. Indigo production declined in the Lowcountry after the American Revolutionary War and loss of exports to the British market, and indigo nearly completely disappeared after the advent of synthetic blue dye in the mid-19th century. However, producing and using indigo dye in art and artisanal crafts has been reclaimed in a Gullah movement with the intent to strengthen the Gullah community's connection to their ancestors' African culture, such as through educational workshops hosted by the Gullah-Geechee Cultural Heritage Corridor.

=== Aesthetics ===
The blue color is appreciated from an aesthetic standpoint for mimicking the color of the sky.

=== Bug and bird nest deterrent ===
The use of haint blue has lost some of its superstitious significance, but modern proponents also cite the color as a spider and wasp-deterrent. It is also believed to be a bird nest deterrent. The repellent effect may have been due to the use of lime and milk in some forms of paint. As of 2018, Erwin and colleagues at the Smithsonian Institution’s O. Orkin Insect Zoo were not able to find scientific research on the subject, but said that it would be a good research study for a student to pursue.

== See also ==
- Apotropaic magic
- Taper burn mark
- Robin egg blue
