= Glossary of British bricklaying =

List of bricklaying terms and their meanings

Air brick
A brick with perforations to allow the passage of air through a wall. Usually used to permit the ventilation of underfloor areas.
Bat
A cut brick. A quarter bat is one-quarter the length of a stretcher. A half-bat is one-half.
Bullnose
Rounded edges are useful for window sills, and capping on low and freestanding walls.
Cant
A header that is angled at less than 90 degrees.
Closer
A cut brick used to change the bond at quoins. Commonly a quarter bat.
Queens closer
A brick that has been cut over its length and is a stretcher long and a quarter-bat deep. Commonly used to bond one brick walls at right-angled quoins.
Kings closer
A brick that has been cut diagonally over its length to show a half-bat at one end and nothing at the other.
Coralent
A brick or block pattern that exhibits a unique interlocking pattern.
Corbel
A brick, block, or stone that oversails the main wall.
Cramp
Or frame cramp is a tie used to secure a window or door frame.
Creasing tile
A flat clay tile laid as a brick to form decorative features or waterproofing to the top of a garden wall.
Dog leg
A brick that is specially made to bond around internal acute angles. Typically 60 or 45 degrees.
Dog tooth
A course of headers where alternate bricks project from the face.
Fire wall
A wall specifically constructed to compartmentalise a building in order to prevent fire spread.
Frog
The indent in a brick, often bearing the maker’s mark
Header
A brick laid flat with its width exposed
Honeycomb wall
A wall, usually stretcher bond, in which the vertical joints are opened up to the size of a quarter bat to allow air to circulate. Commonly used in sleeper walls.
Indent
A hole left in a wall in order to accommodate an adjoining wall at a future date. These are often left to permit temporary access to the work area.
Movement joint
A straight joint formed in a wall to contain compressible material, in order to prevent cracking as the wall contracts or expands.
Nogging
Infill brick panels in timber framework buildings
Party wall
A wall shared by two properties or parties.
Pier
A free-standing section of masonry such as pillar or panel.
Plinth
A stretcher that is angled at less than 90 degrees.
Quoin
A corner in masonry.
Racking back
Stepping back the bond as the wall increases in height in order to allow the work to proceed at a future date.
Rowlock
A brick laid on the long narrow side with the short end of the brick exposed
Sailor
A brick laid vertically with the broad face of the brick exposed
Saw tooth
A course of headers laid at a 45-degree angle to the main face.
Shear wall
A wall designed to give way in the event of structural failure in order to preserve the integrity of the remaining building.
Shiner
A brick laid on the long narrow side with the broad face of the brick exposed
Sleeper wall
A low wall whose function is to provide support, typically to floor joists.
Slip
A thin cut of brick, sometimes referred to as a tile- used on internal spaces or in cladding systems.
Snapped header
A half-bat laid to appear as a header. Commonly used to build short-radii half-brick walls or decorative features.
Soldier
A brick laid vertically with its long narrow side exposed
Squint
A brick that is specially made to bond around external quoins of obtuse angles. Typically 60 or 45 degrees.
Stopped end
The end of a wall that does not abut any other component.
Stretcher
A brick laid flat with its long narrow side exposed
Toothing
The forming of a temporary stopped end in such a way as to allow the bond to continue at a later date as the work proceeds.
Tumbling in
Bonding a battered buttress or breast into a horizontal wall.
Voussoir
A supporting brick in an arch, usually shaped to ensure that the joints appear even.
Withe
The central wall dividing two shafts. Most commonly to divide flues within a chimney.
