= Brickwork =

Masonry made of bricks and mortar

Coal Drops Yard wall, King's Cross Central, London

Brickwork is masonry produced by a bricklayer, using bricks and mortar. Typically, rows of bricks called courses are laid on top of one another to build up a structure such as a brick wall.

Bricks may be differentiated from blocks by size. For example, in the UK a brick is defined as a unit having dimensions of less than 337.5 × 225 × 112.5 mm (13.3 × 8.9 × 4.4 inches) and a block is defined as a unit having one or more dimensions greater than the largest possible brick.

Brick is a popular medium for constructing buildings, and examples of brickwork are found through history as far back as the Bronze Age. The fired-brick faces of the ziggurat of ancient Dur-Kurigalzu in Iraq date from around 1400 BC, and the brick buildings of ancient Mohenjo-daro in modern day Pakistan were built around 2600 BC. Much older examples of brickwork made with dried (but not fired) bricks may be found in such ancient locations as Jericho in Palestine, Çatal Höyük in Anatolia, and Mehrgarh in Pakistan. These structures have survived from the Stone Age to the modern day.

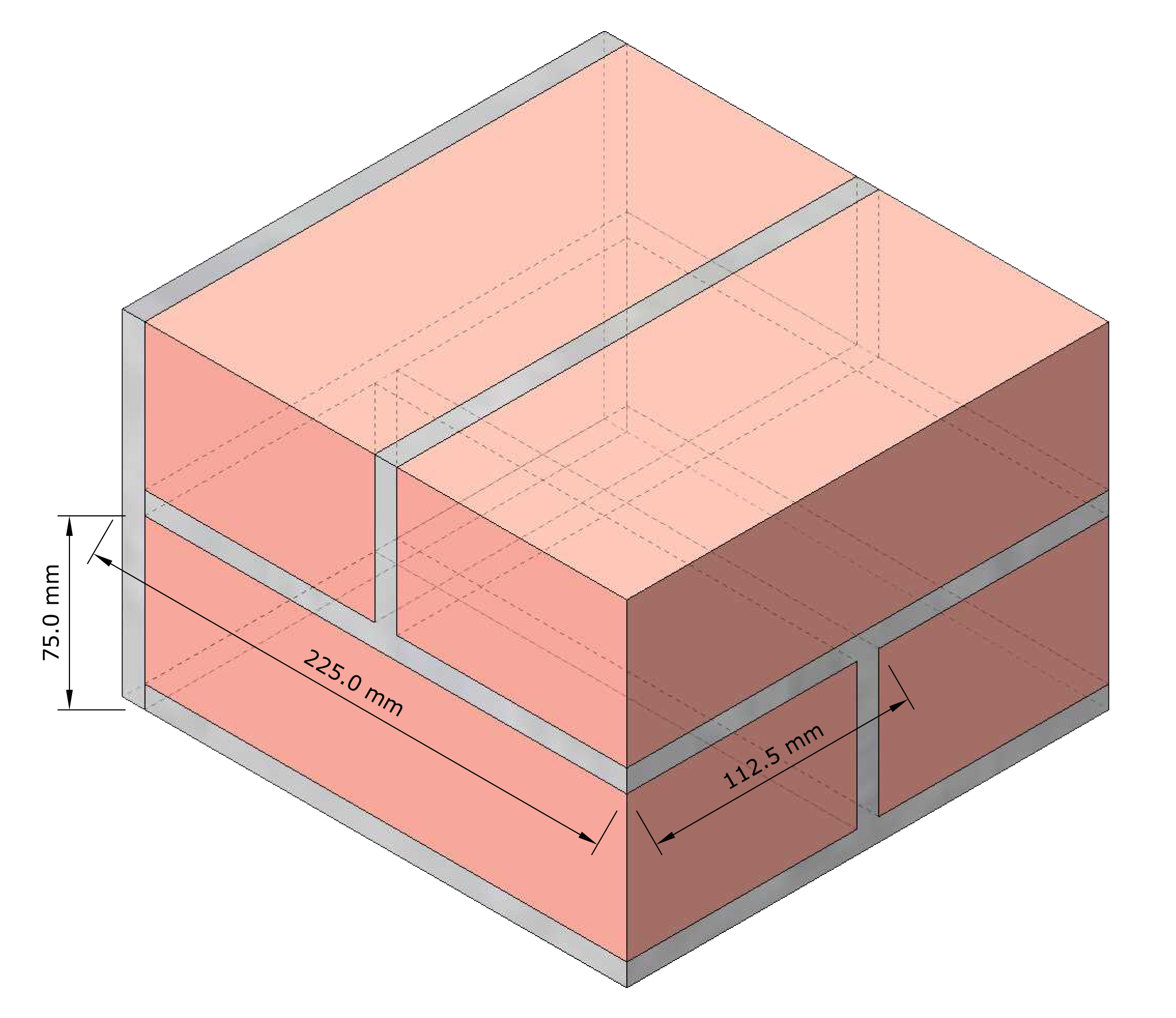
Co-ordination dimensions of a brick in a wall

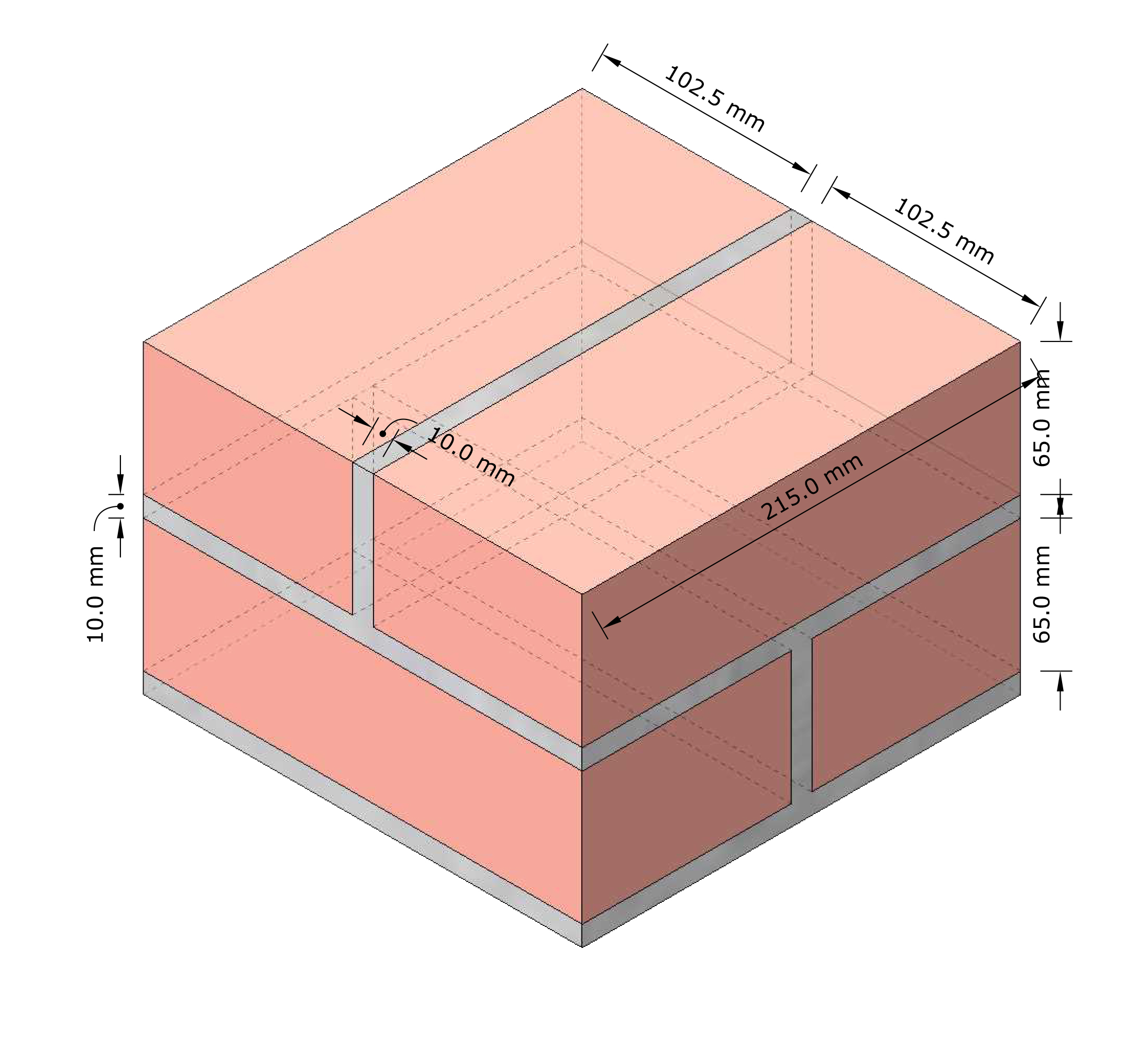
Working dimensions of a brick in a wall

Brick dimensions are expressed in construction or technical documents in two ways as co-ordinating dimensions and working dimensions.

- Coordination dimensions are the actual physical dimensions of the brick with the mortar required on one header face, one stretcher face and one bed.
- Working dimensions is the size of a manufactured brick. It is also called the nominal size of a brick.

Brick size may be slightly different due to shrinkage or distortion due to firing, etc.

An example of a co-ordinating metric commonly used for bricks in the UK is as follows:

- Bricks of dimensions 215 mm × 102.5 mm × 65 mm;
- Mortar beds (horizontal) and perpends (vertical) of a uniform 10 mm.

In this case the co-ordinating metric works because the length of a single brick (215 mm) is equal to the total of the width of a brick (102.5 mm) plus a perpend (10 mm) plus the width of a second brick (102.5 mm).

There are many other brick sizes worldwide, and many of them use this same co-ordinating principle.

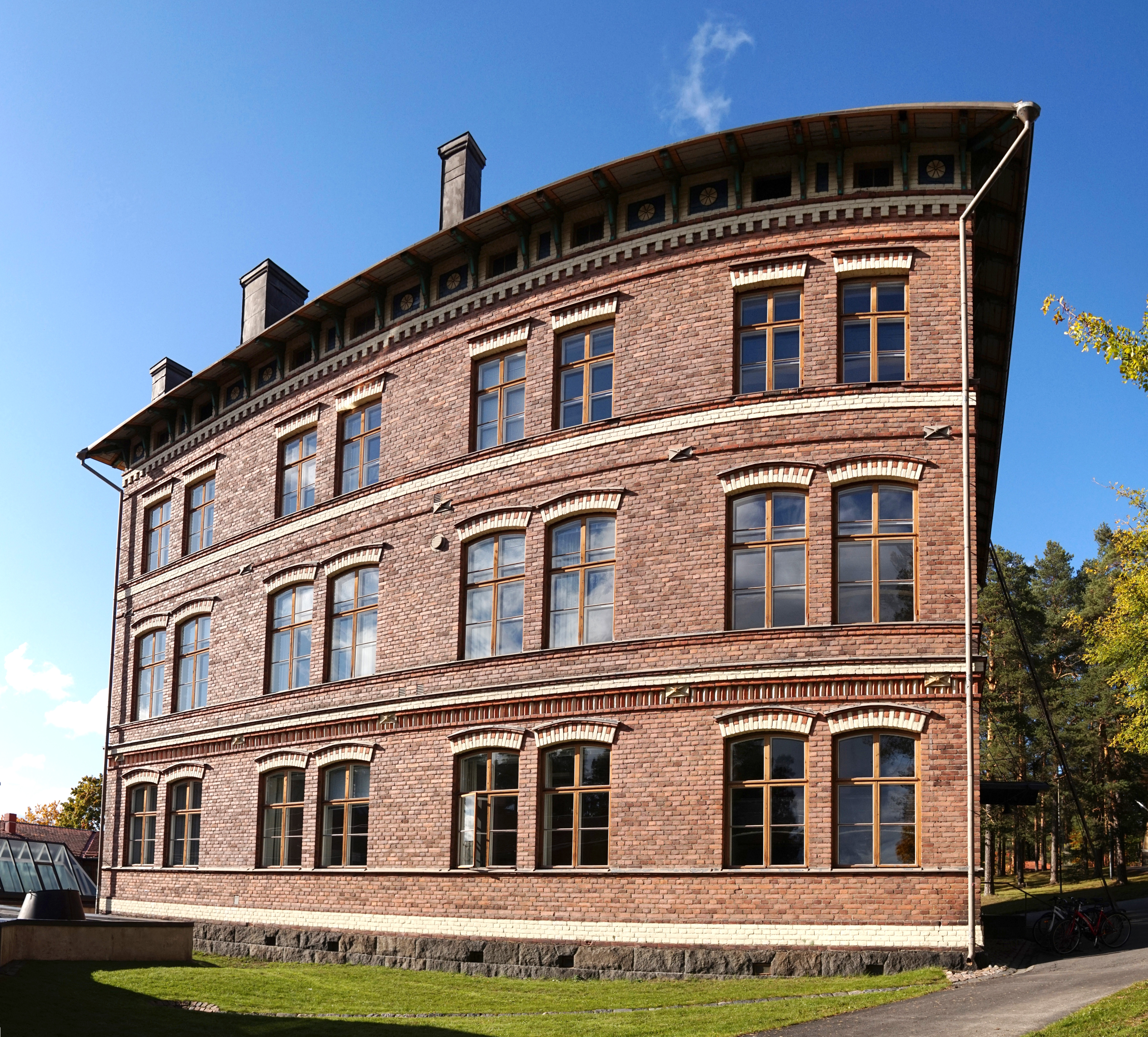
One of the buildings of the University of Jyväskylä, from Jyväskylä (Finland)

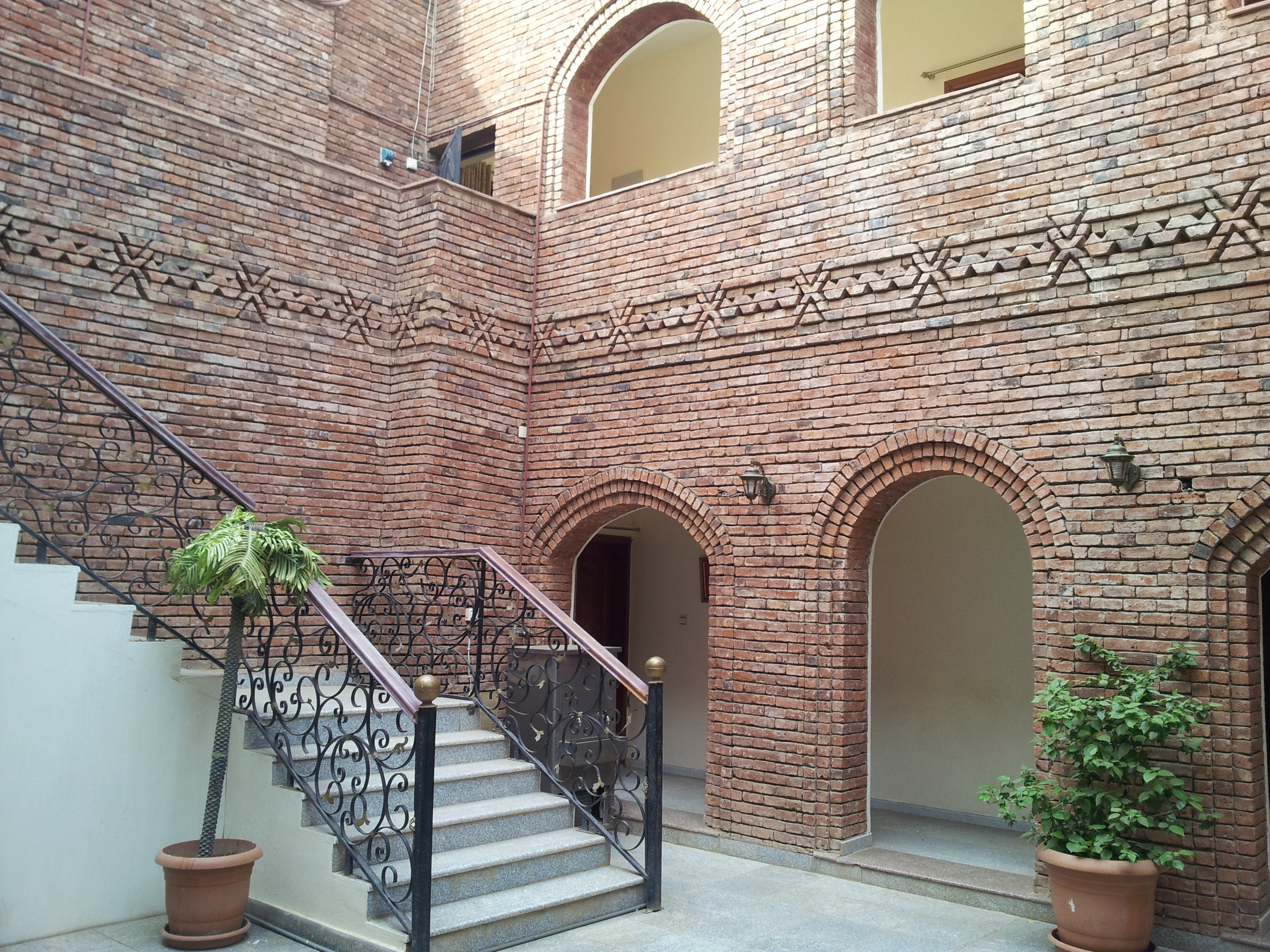
Courtyard with brickwork in Yemen

Polychromatic and indented brickwork, St. Patrick Church, Kinkora, Ontario

View of the Daylit Gallery, Victoria and Albert Museum, London

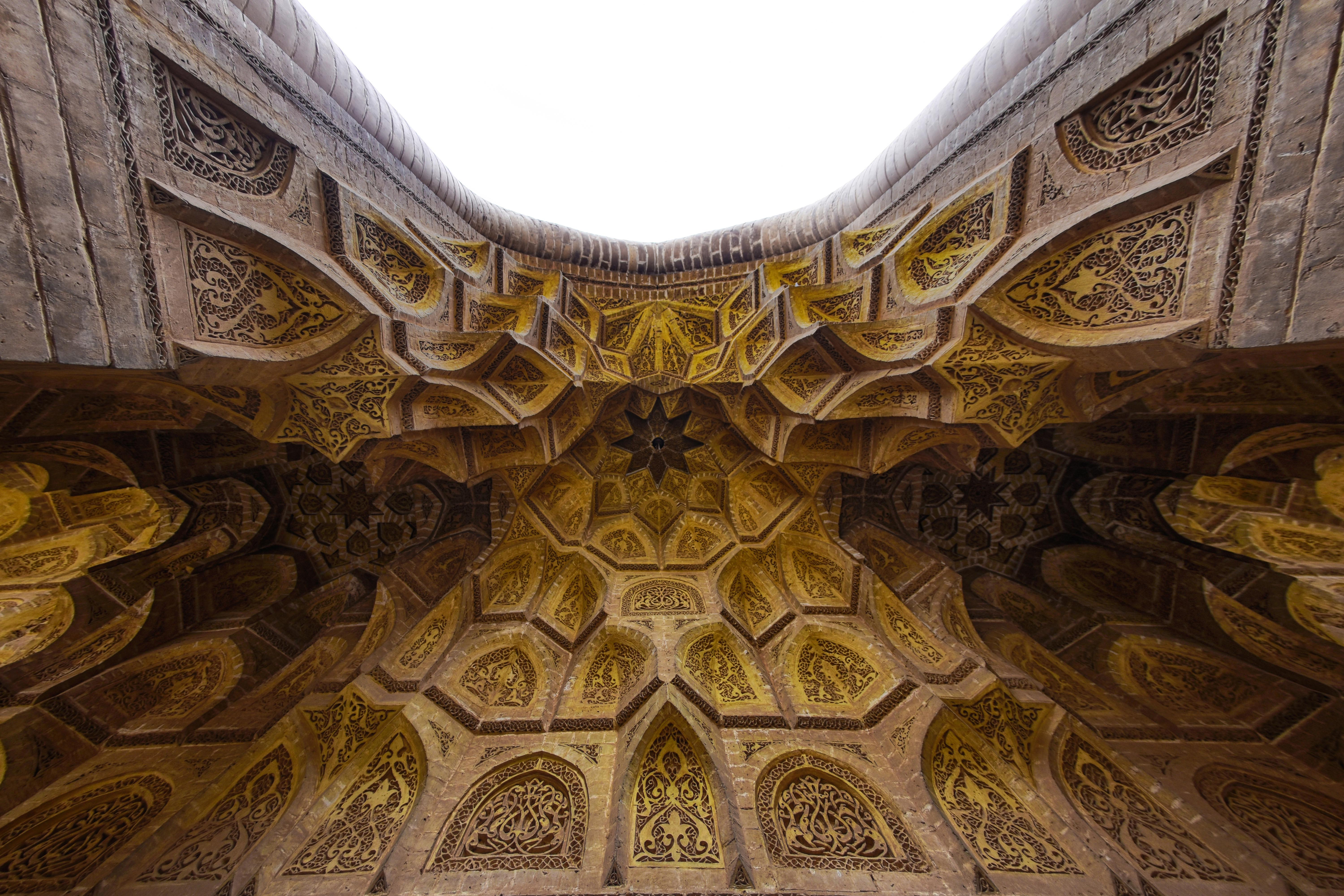
Abbasid Palace, Baghdad, Iraq

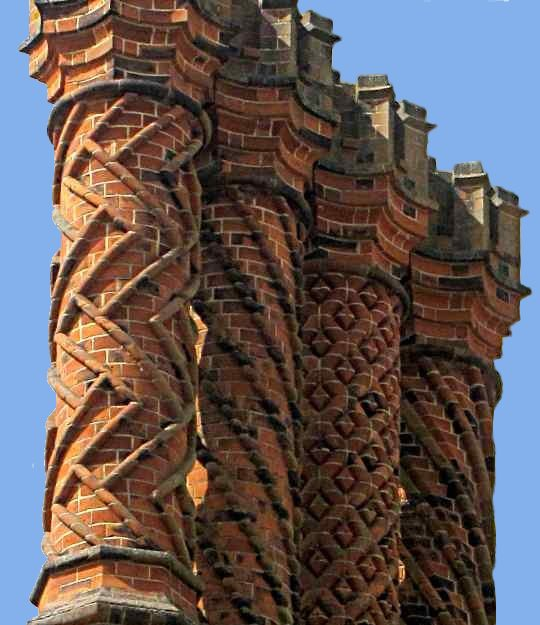
Decorative Tudor brick chimneys, Hampton Court Palace, UK

== Terminology ==
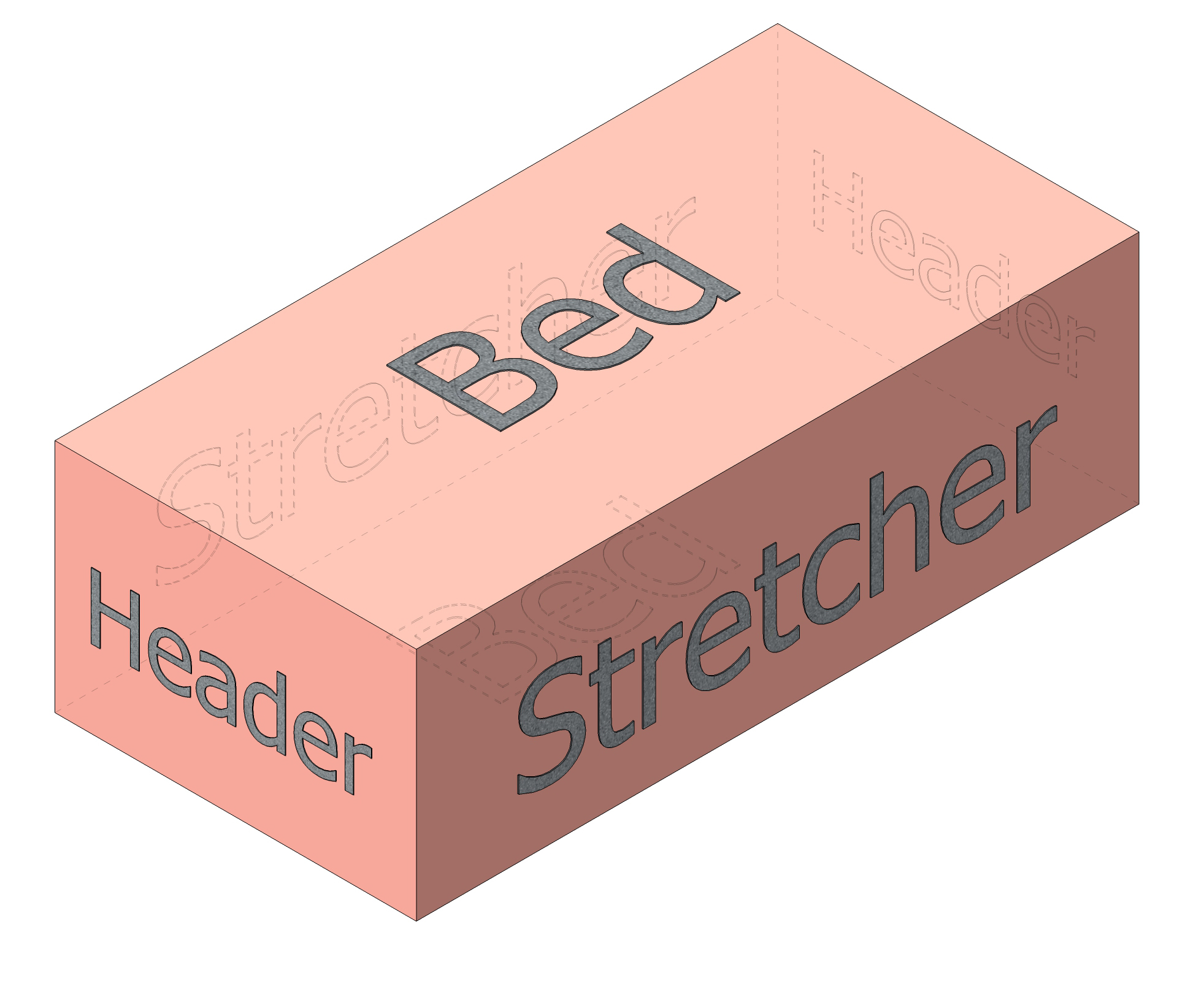
Faces of brick

As the most common bricks are rectangular prisms, six surfaces are named as follows:

- Top and bottom surfaces are called beds
- Ends or narrow surfaces are called headers or header faces
- Sides or wider surfaces are called stretchers or stretcher faces

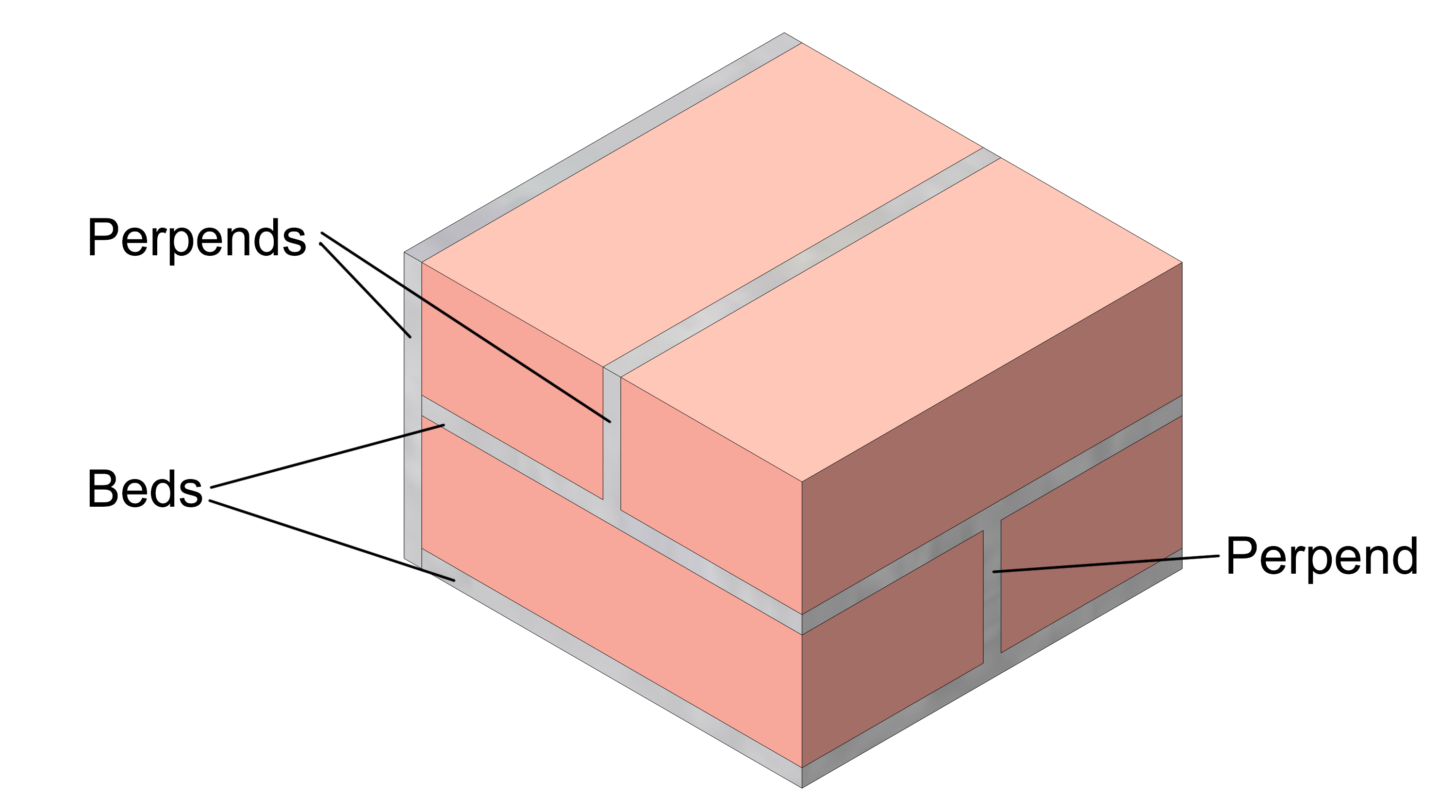
Mortar terminology, showing perpends and bed

Mortar placed between bricks is also given separate names with respect to their position. Mortar placed horizontally below or top of a brick is called a bed, and mortar placed vertically between bricks is called a perpend, or, in the United States, a head joint.

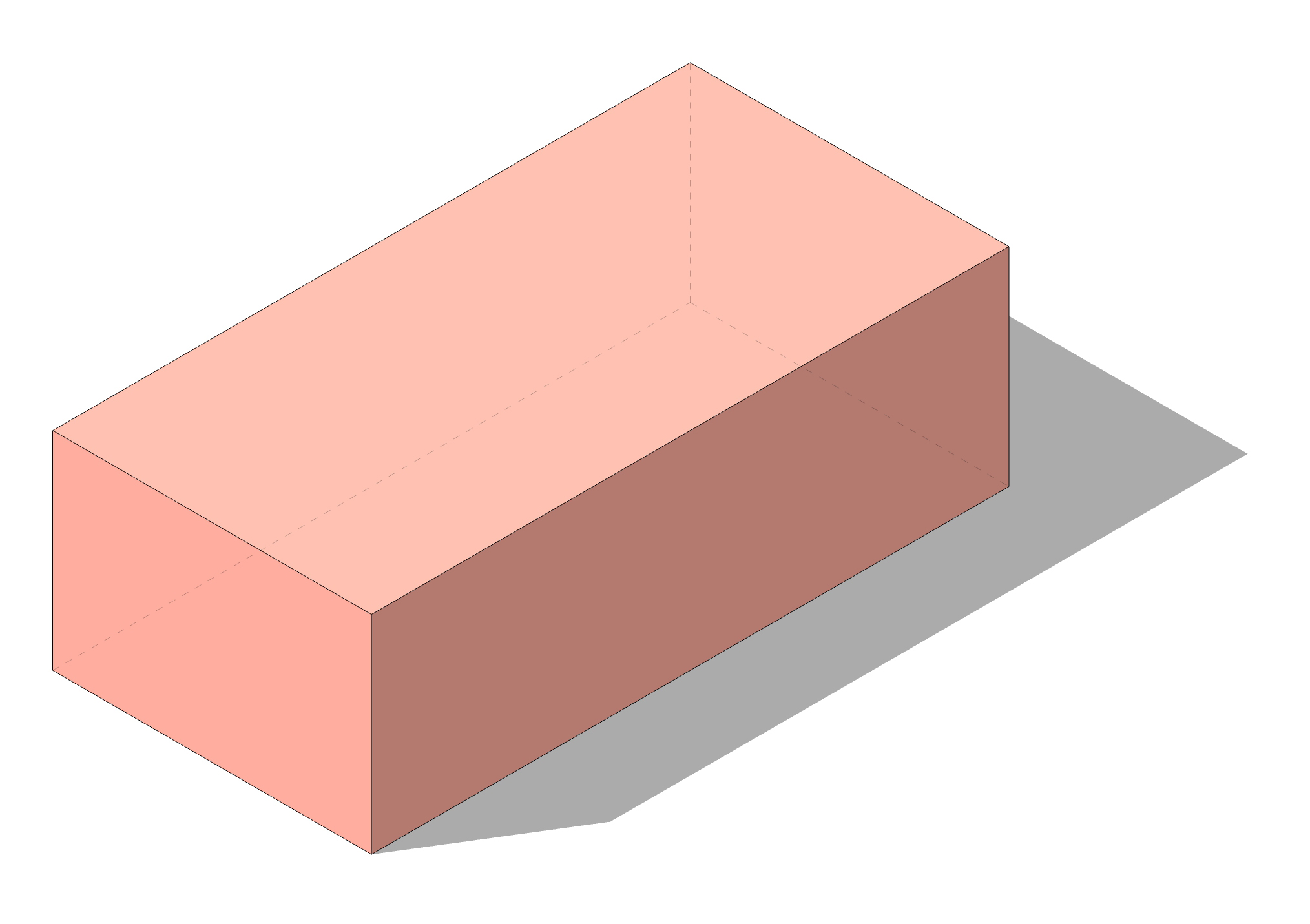
Solid brick

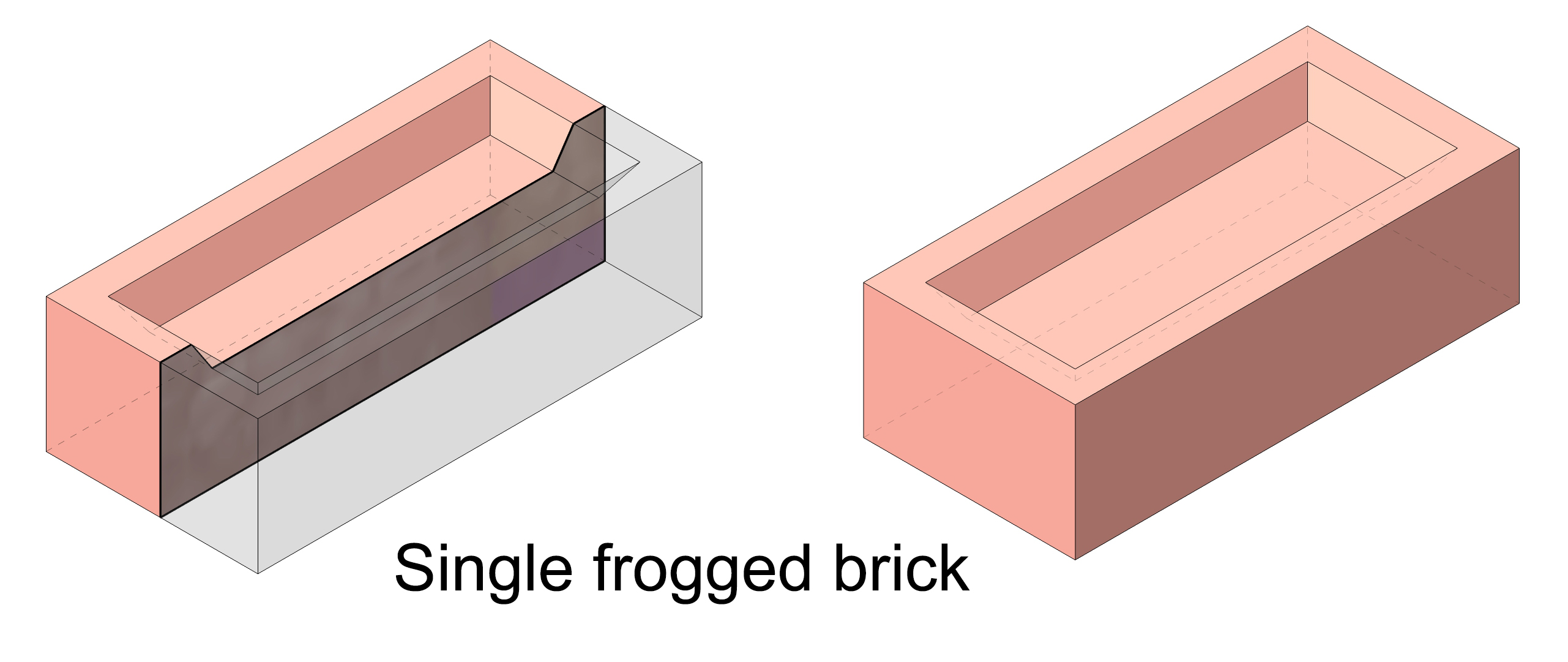
Single frogged brick

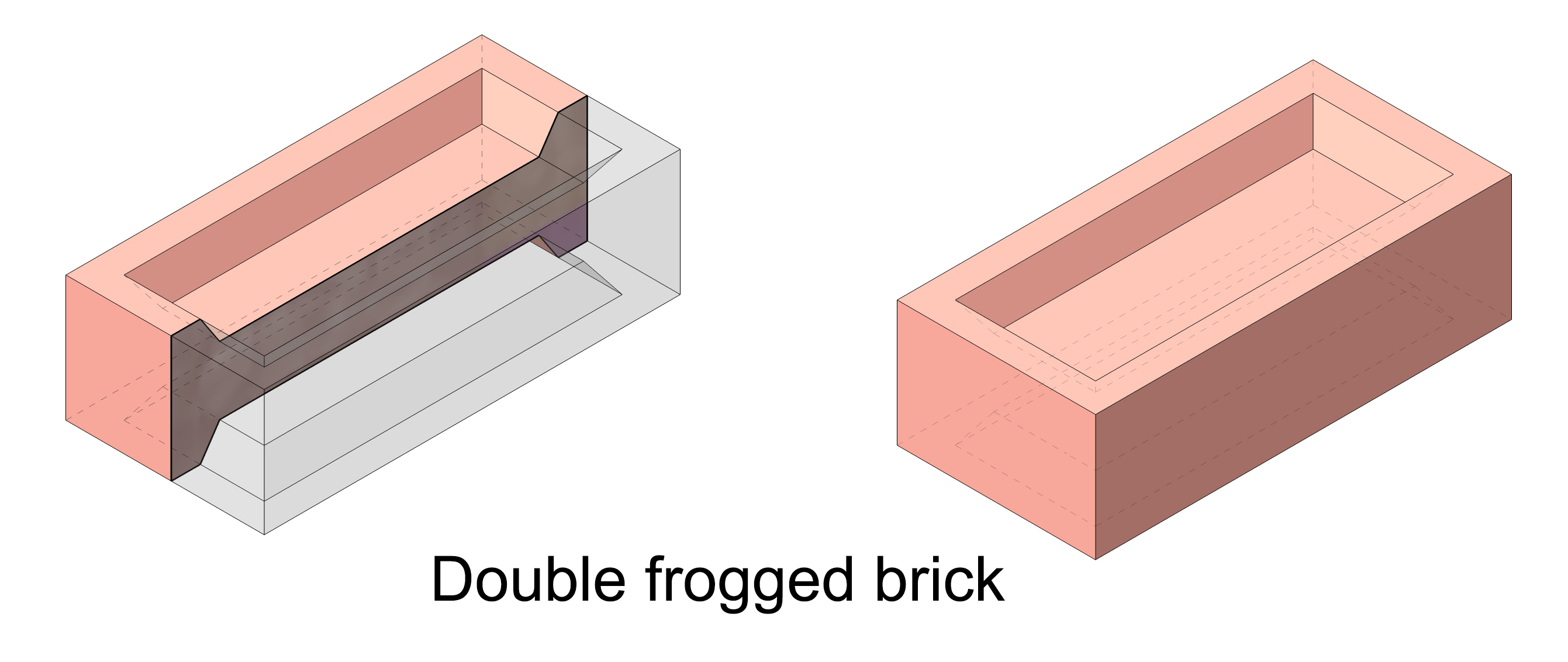
Double frogged brick

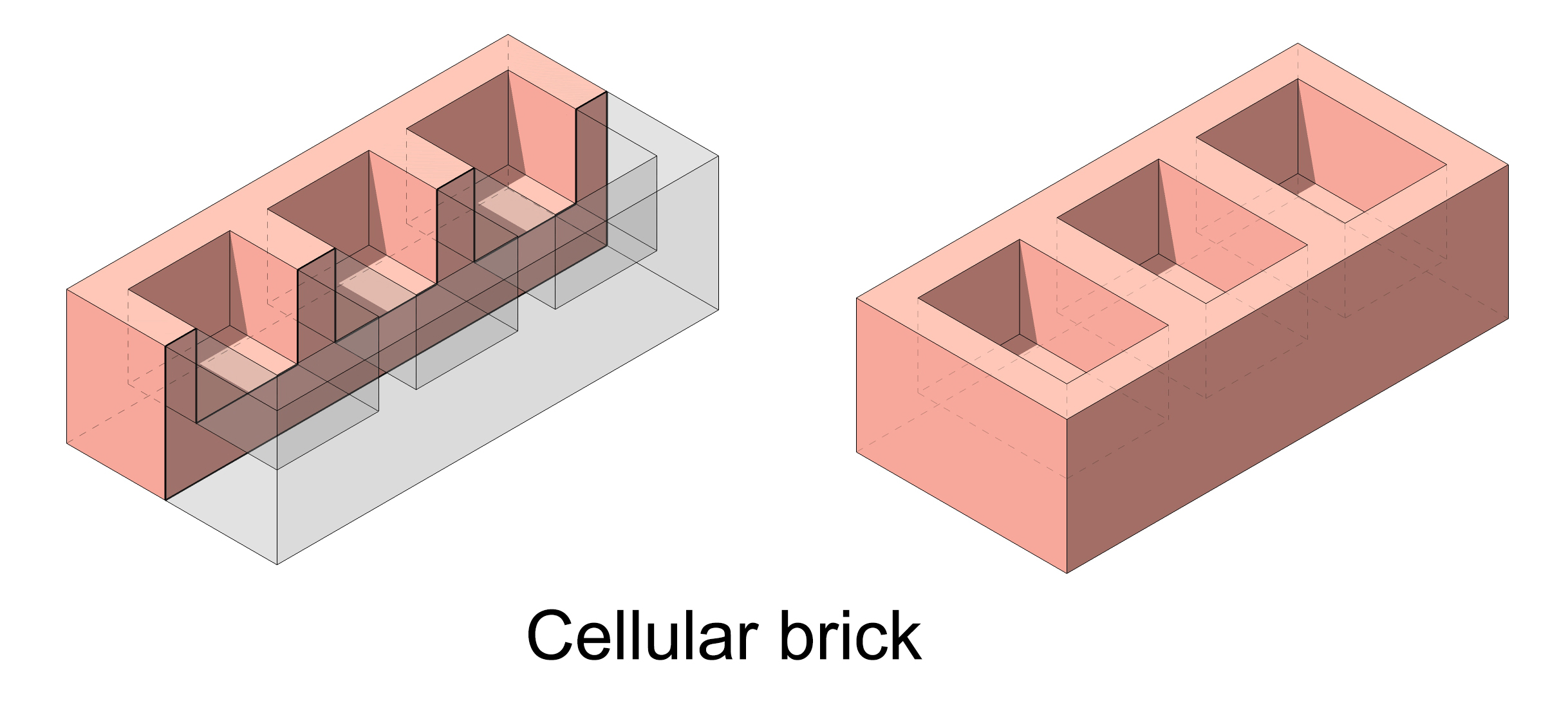
Cellular brick

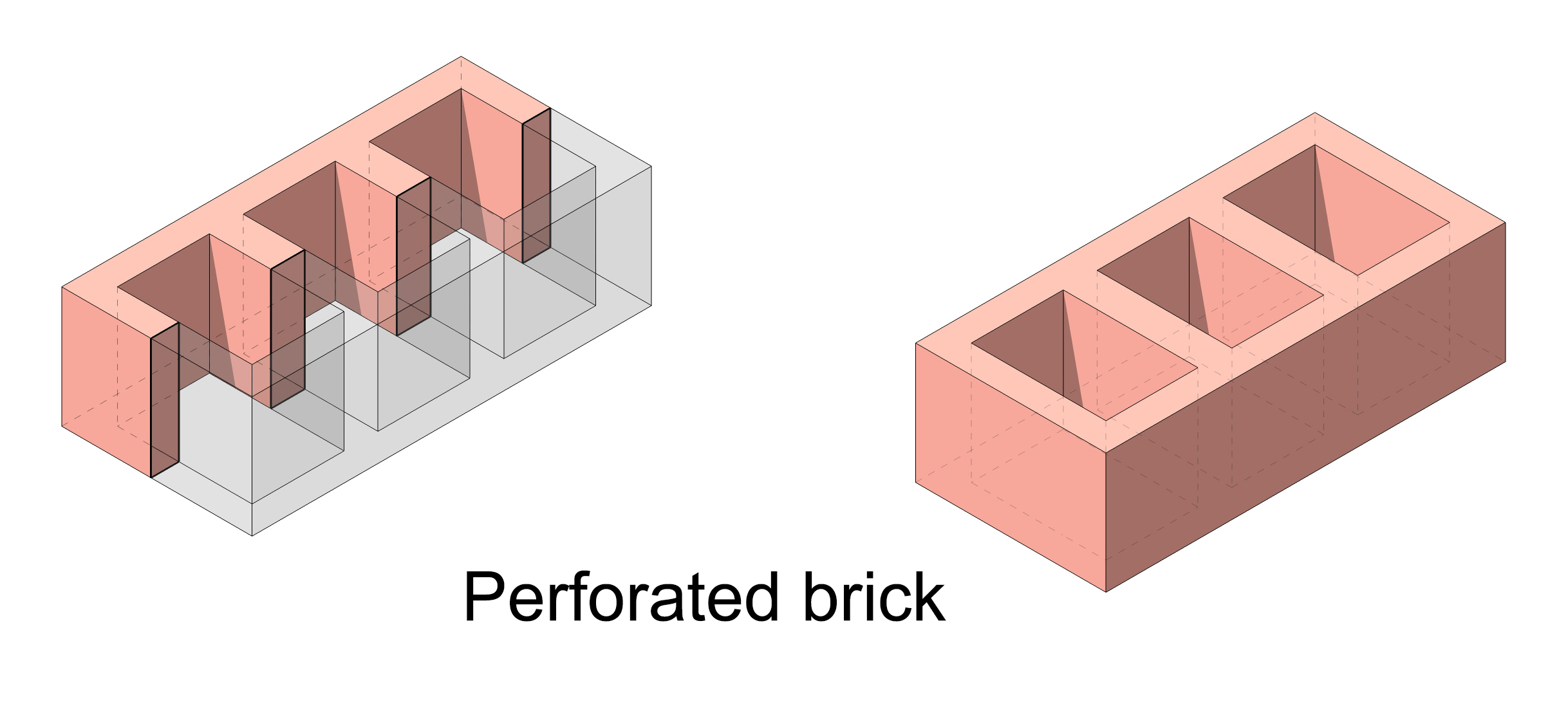
Perforated brick

A brick made with just rectilinear dimensions is called a solid brick. Bricks might have a depression on both beds or on a single bed. The depression is called a frog, and the bricks are known as frogged bricks. Frogs can be deep or shallow but should never exceed 20% of the total volume of the brick. Cellular bricks have depressions exceeding 20% of the volume of the brick. Perforated bricks have holes through the brick from bed to bed, cutting it all the way. Most of the building standards and good construction practices recommend the volume of holes should not exceed 20% of the total volume of the brick.

Parts of brickwork include bricks, beds and perpends. The bed is the mortar upon which a brick is laid. A perpend is a vertical joint between any two bricks and is usually—but not always—filled with mortar.

A "face brick" is a higher-quality brick, designed for use in visible external surfaces in face-work, as opposed to a "filler brick" for internal parts of the wall, or where the surface is to be covered with stucco or a similar coating, or where the filler bricks will be concealed by other bricks (in structures more than two bricks thick).

== Orientation ==
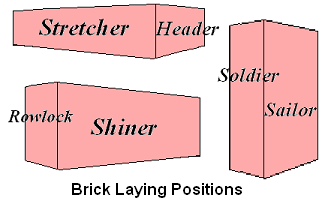
Six positions

A brick is given a classification based on how it is laid, and how the exposed face is oriented relative to the face of the finished wall.

Stretcher or stretching brick
A brick laid flat with its long narrow side exposed.
Header or heading brick
A brick laid flat with its width exposed.
Soldier
A brick laid vertically with its long narrow side exposed.
Sailor
A brick laid vertically with the broad face of the brick exposed.
Rowlock
A brick laid on the long narrow side with the short end of the brick exposed.
Shiner or rowlock stretcher
A brick laid on the long narrow side with the broad face of the brick exposed.

== Cut ==
The practice of laying uncut full-sized bricks wherever possible gives brickwork its maximum possible strength. In the diagrams below, such uncut full-sized bricks are coloured as follows:

Stretcher
Header

Occasionally, however, a brick must be cut to fit a given space or to be the right shape for some purpose — for example, creating an offset (a lap) at the beginning of a course. In some cases these special shapes or sizes are manufactured. In the diagrams below, some of the cuts most commonly used for generating a lap are coloured as follows:

Three-quarter bat, stretching
A brick cut to three-quarters of its length, laid flat and appearing like a three-quarter stretcher.
Three-quarter bat, heading
A brick cut to three-quarters of its length, laid flat and appearing like a normal header, but with three-quarters of the length behind the exposed face.
Half bat
A brick cut in half across the middle, laid flat and appearing like a normal header, but with half the length behind the exposed face.
Queen closer
A lengthwise half brick, laid as a half-width header with its smallest face exposed standing vertically. A queen closer is often used for the purpose of creating a lap.

Less frequently used cuts are all coloured as follows:

Quarter bat
A brick cut to a quarter of its length.
Three-quarter queen closer
A queen closer cut to three-quarters of its length.
King closer
A brick with one corner cut away, leaving one header face at half its standard width.

== Bonding ==
A nearly universal rule in brickwork is that perpends should not be contiguous across courses.

Walls, running linearly and extending upwards, can be of varying depth or thickness. Typically, the bricks are laid also running linearly and extending upwards, forming wythes or leafs. It is as important as with the perpends to bond these leaves together. Historically, the dominant method for consolidating the leaves together was to lay bricks across them, rather than running linearly.

Brickwork observing either or both of these two conventions is described as being laid in one or another bond.

== Thickness (and leaves) ==
A leaf is as thick as the width of one brick. A wall is said to be "one brick thick" if it is as wide as the length of a brick. Accordingly, a single-leaf wall is a half brick thickness; a wall with the simplest possible masonry transverse bond is said to be one brick thick, and so on.

The thickness specified for a wall is determined by such factors as damp proofing considerations, whether or not the wall has a cavity, load-bearing requirements, expense, and the era during which the architect was or is working. Wall thickness specification has varied considerably, and while some non-load-bearing brick walls may be as little as half a brick thick, or even less when shiners are laid stretcher bond in partition walls, other brick walls are much thicker. The Monadnock Building in Chicago, for example, is a very tall masonry building, and has load-bearing brick walls nearly two metres (6 ft 7 in) thick at the base. The majority of brick walls are however usually between one and three bricks thick. At these more modest wall thicknesses, distinct patterns have emerged allowing for a structurally sound layout of bricks internal to each particular specified thickness of wall.

=== Cavity walls and ties ===
The advent during the mid twentieth century of the cavity wall saw the popularisation and development of another method of strengthening brickwork—the wall tie. A cavity wall comprises two totally discrete walls, separated by an air gap, which serves both as barrier to moisture and heat. Typically the main loads taken by the foundations are carried there by the inner leaf, and the major functions of the external leaf are to protect the whole from weather, and to provide a fitting aesthetic finish.

Despite there being no masonry connection between the leaves, their transverse rigidity still needs to be guaranteed. The device used to satisfy this need is the insertion at regular intervals of wall ties into the cavity wall's mortar beds.

== Load-bearing bonds ==
=== Courses of mixed headers and stretchers ===
Flemish bond

Monk bond

Sussex bond

==== Flemish bond ====
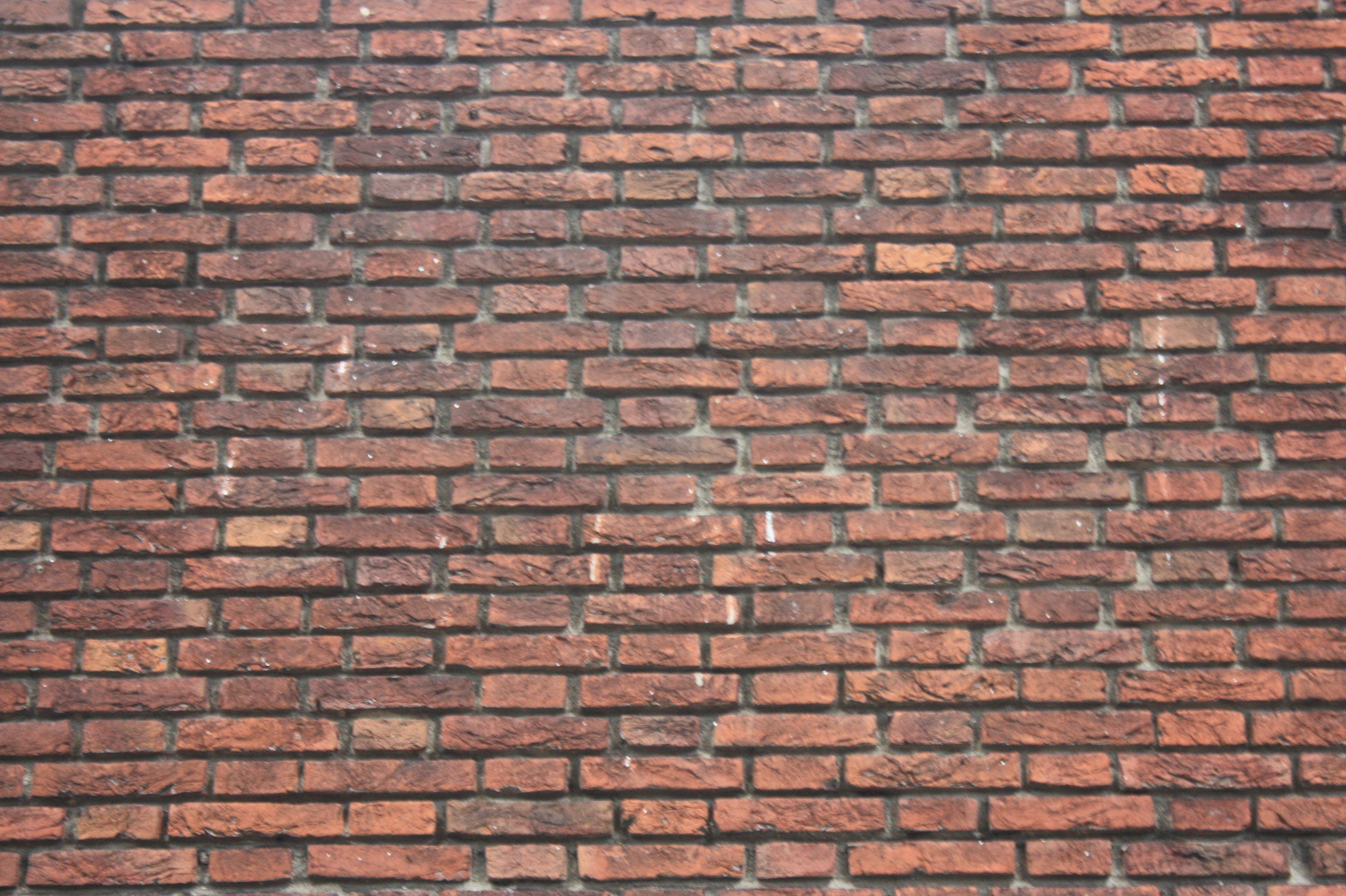
Brickwork in Flemish bond

Flemish bond has one stretcher between headers, with the headers centred over the stretchers in the courses below.

Where a course begins with a quoin stretcher, the course will ordinarily terminate with a quoin stretcher at the other end. The next course up will begin with a quoin header. For the course's second brick, a queen closer is laid, generating the lap of the bond. The third brick along is a stretcher, and is—on account of the lap—centred above the header below. This second course then resumes its paired run of stretcher and header, until the final pair is reached, whereupon a second and final queen closer is inserted as the penultimate brick, mirroring the arrangement at the beginning of the course, and duly closing the bond.

Some examples of Flemish bond incorporate stretchers of one colour and headers of another. This effect is commonly a product of treating the header face of the heading bricks while the bricks are being baked as part of the manufacturing process. Some of the header faces are exposed to wood smoke, generating a grey-blue colour, while other simply vitrified until they reach a deeper blue colour. Some headers have a glazed face, caused by using salt in the firing. Sometimes Staffordshire blue bricks are used for the heading bricks.

Brickwork that appears as Flemish bond from both the front and the rear is double Flemish bond, so called on account of the front and rear duplication of the pattern. If the wall is arranged such that the bricks at the rear do not have this pattern, then the brickwork is said to be single Flemish bond.

Flemish bond brickwork with a thickness of one brick is the repeating pattern of a stretcher laid immediately to the rear of the face stretcher, and then next along the course, a header. A lap (correct overlap) is generated by a queen closer on every alternate course:

Double Flemish bond of one brick's thickness: overhead sections of alternate (odd and even) courses, and side elevation

The colour-coded plans highlight facing bricks in the east–west wall. An elevation for this east–west wall is shown to the right.

A simple way to add some width to the wall would be to add stretching bricks at the rear, making a Single Flemish bond one and a half bricks thick:

Overhead sections of alternate (odd and even) courses of single Flemish bond of one and a half bricks' thickness

The colour-coded plans highlight facing bricks in the east–west wall. An elevation for this east–west wall is shown to the right.

For a double Flemish bond of one and a half bricks' thickness, facing bricks and the bricks behind the facing bricks may be laid in groups of four bricks and a half-bat. The half-bat sits at the centre of the group and the four bricks are placed about the half-bat, in a square formation. These groups are laid next to each other for the length of a course, making brickwork one and a half bricks thick.

To preserve the bond, it is necessary to lay a three-quarter bat instead of a header following a quoin stretcher at the corner of the wall. This fact has no bearing on the appearance of the wall; the choice of brick appears to the spectator like any ordinary header:

Overhead plans of alternate (odd and even) courses of double Flemish bond of one and a half bricks' thickness

The colour-coded plans highlight facing bricks in the east–west wall. An elevation for this east–west wall is shown to the right.

For a more substantial wall, a header may be laid directly behind the face header, a further two headers laid at 90° behind the face stretcher, and then finally a stretcher laid to the rear of these two headers. This pattern generates brickwork a full two bricks thick:

Overhead sections of alternate (odd and even) courses of double Flemish bond of two bricks' thickness

The colour-coded plans highlight facing bricks in the east–west wall. An elevation for this east–west wall is shown to the right.

Overhead sections of alternate (odd and even) courses of double Flemish bond of two and a half bricks' thickness

The colour-coded plans highlight facing bricks in the east–west wall. An elevation for this east–west wall is shown to the right.

For a still more substantial wall, two headers may be laid directly behind the face header, a further two pairs of headers laid at 90° behind the face stretcher, and then finally a stretcher laid to the rear of these four headers. This pattern generates brickwork a full three bricks thick:

Overhead sections of alternate (odd and even) courses of double Flemish bond of three bricks' thickness

The colour-coded plans highlight facing bricks in the east–west wall. An elevation for this east–west wall is shown to the right.

==== Monk bond ====
Monk bond variations

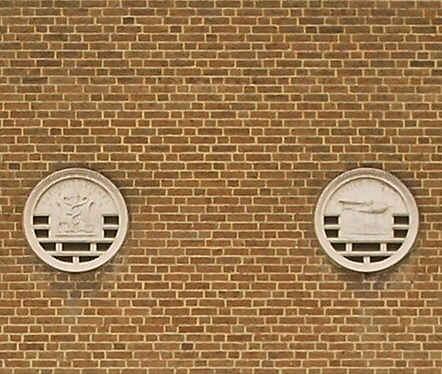
New Malden Library, Kingston upon Thames, Greater London

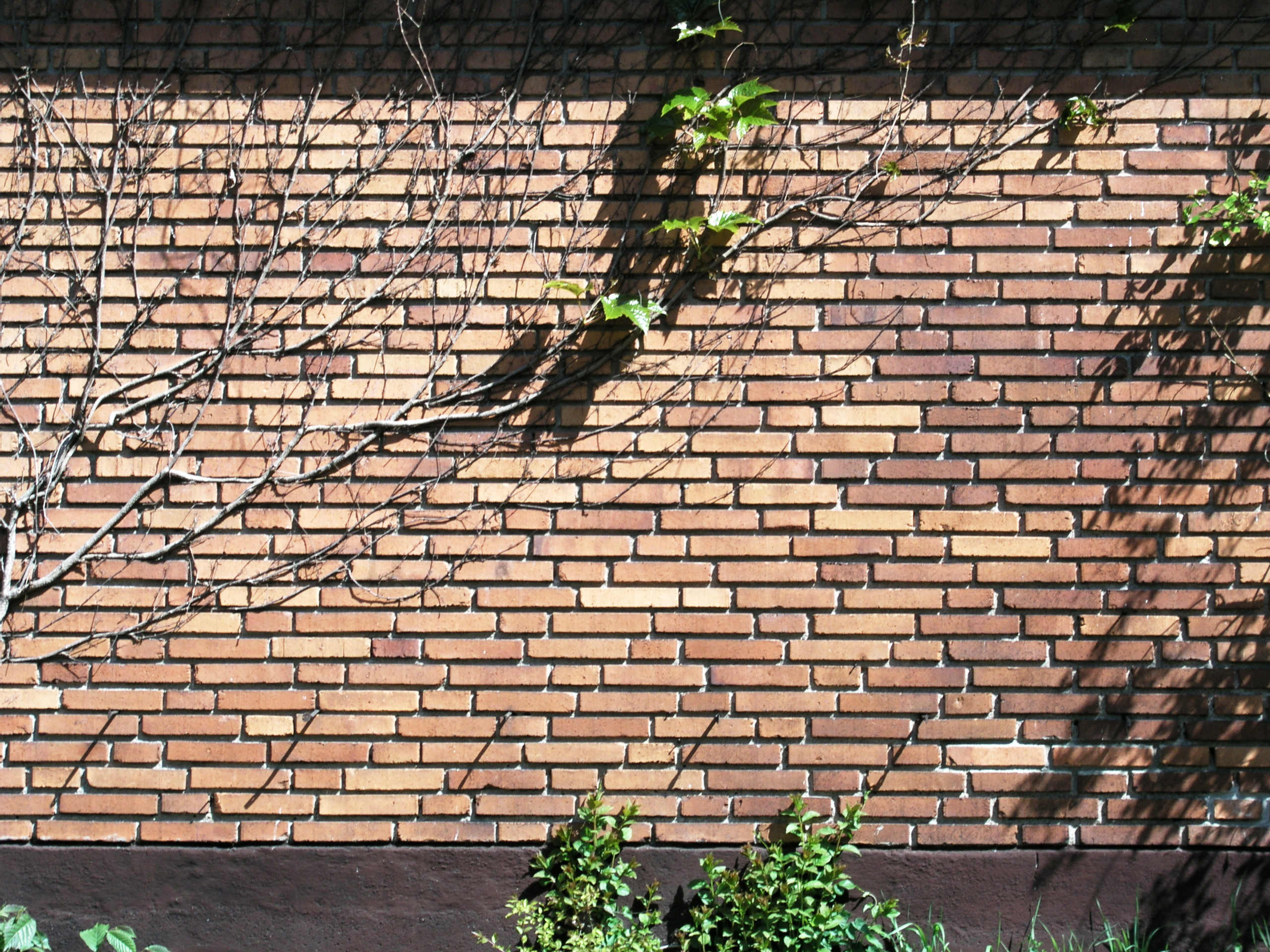
Private building, Solna, Sweden

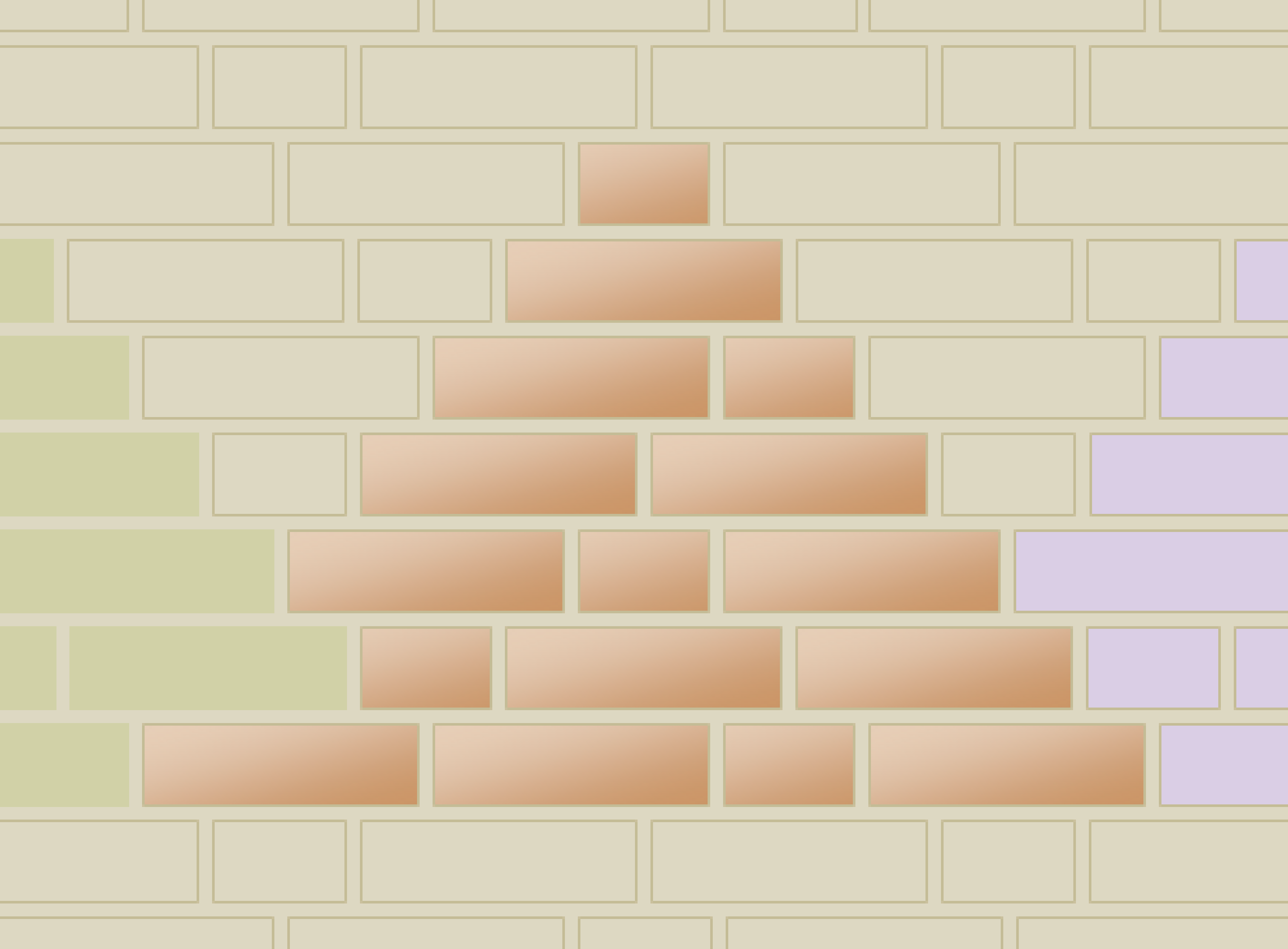
Pyramids highlighted

This bond has two stretchers between every header with the headers centred over the perpend between the two stretchers in the course below in the bond's most symmetric form.

The great variety of monk bond patterns allow for many possible layouts at the quoins, and many possible arrangements for generating a lap. A quoin brick may be a stretcher, a three-quarter bat, or a header. Queen closers may be used next to the quoins, but the practice is not mandatory.

===== Raking monk bonds =====
Monk bond may however take any of a number of arrangements for course staggering. The disposal of bricks in these often highly irregular raking patterns can be a challenging task for the bricklayer to correctly maintain while constructing a wall whose courses are partially obscured by scaffold, and interrupted by door or window openings, or other bond-disrupting obstacles. If the bricklayer frequently stops to check that bricks are correctly arranged, then masonry in a raking monk bond can be expensive to build.

Occasionally, brickwork in such a raking monk bond may contain minor errors of header and stretcher alignment some of which may have been silently corrected by incorporating a compensating irregularity into the brickwork in a course further up the wall. In spite of these complexities and their associated costs, the bond has proven a common choice for constructing brickwork in the north of Europe.

Raking courses in monk bond may, for instance, be staggered in such a way as to generate the appearance of diagonal lines of stretchers. One method of achieving this effect relies on the use of a repeating sequence of courses with back-and-forth header staggering. In this grouping, a header appears at a given point in the group's first course. In the next course up, a header is offset one and a half stretcher lengths to the left of the header in the course below, and then in the third course, a header is offset one stretcher length to the right of the header in the middle course. This accented swing of headers, one and a half to the left, and one to the right, generates the appearance of lines of stretchers running from the upper left hand side of the wall down to the lower right. Such an example of a raking monk bond layout is shown in the New Malden Library, Kingston upon Thames, Greater London.

Elsewhere, raking courses in monk bond may be staggered in such a way as to generate a subtle appearance of indented pyramid-like diagonals. Such an arrangement appears in the picture here from the building in Solna, Sweden.

Many other particular adjustments of course alignment exist in monk bond, generating a variety of visual effects which differ in detail, but often having the effect of directing a viewing eye diagonally down the wall.

Overhead plan for alternate courses of monk bond of one brick's thickness

The colour-coded plans highlight facing bricks in the east–west wall. An elevation for this east–west wall is shown to the right.

==== Sussex bond ====
This bond has three stretchers between every header, with the headers centred above the midpoint of three stretchers in the course below.

The bond's horizontally extended proportion suits long stretches of masonry such as garden walls or the run of brickwork over a ribbon window; conversely, the bond is less suitable for a surface occupied by many features, such as a Georgian façade. The relatively infrequent use of headers serves to make Sussex bond one of the less expensive bonds in which to build a wall, as it allows for the bricklayer to proceed rapidly with run after run of three stretchers at a time.

=== One stretching course per heading course ===
English bond

English cross bond

Double English cross bond

One of the two kinds of course in this family of bonds is called a stretching course, and this typically comprises nothing but stretchers at the face from quoin to quoin. The other kind of course is the heading course, and this usually consists of headers, with two queen closers—one by the quoin header at either end—to generate the bond.

==== English bond ====
This bond has alternating stretching and heading courses, with the headers centred over the midpoint of the stretchers, and perpends in each alternate course aligned. Queen closers appear as the second brick, and the penultimate brick in heading courses. A muted colour scheme for occasional headers is sometimes used in English bond to lend a subtle texture to the brickwork. Examples of such schemes include blue-grey headers among otherwise red bricks—seen in the south of England—and light brown headers in a dark brown wall, more often found in parts of the north of England.

Overhead plan for alternate courses of English bond of one brick's thickness

The colour-coded plans highlight facing bricks in the east–west wall. An elevation for this east–west wall is shown to the right.

Overhead plan for alternate courses of English bond of one and a half bricks' thickness

The colour-coded plans highlight facing bricks in the east–west wall. An elevation for this east–west wall is shown to the right.

Overhead plan for alternate courses of English bond of two bricks' thickness

The colour-coded plans highlight facing bricks in the east–west wall. An elevation for this east–west wall is shown to the right.

==== English cross bond ====
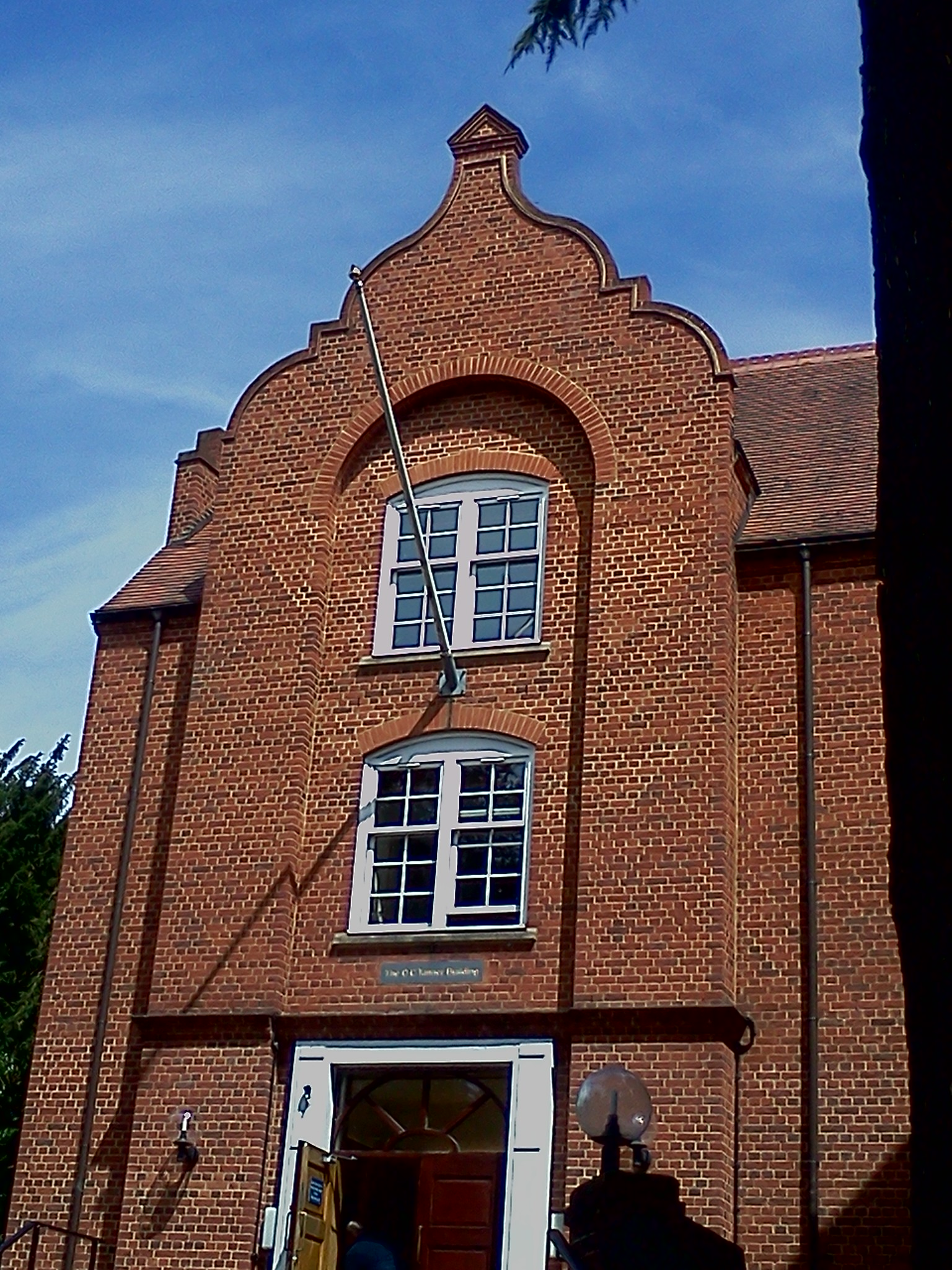
Dutch bond, Linacre College, Oxford

This bond also has alternating stretching and heading courses. However, whilst the heading courses are identical with those found in the standard English bond, the stretching courses alternate between a course composed entirely of stretchers, and a course composed of stretchers half off-set relative to the stretchers two courses above or below, by reason of a header placed just before the quoins at either end. The bond is widely found in Northern France, Belgium and the Netherlands.

Large areas of English cross bond can appear to have a twill like characteristic, an effect caused by the unbroken series of perpends moving diagonally down the bond.

==== Dutch bond ====
This bond is exactly like English cross bond except in the generating of the lap at the quoins. In Dutch bond, all quoins are three-quarter bats—placed in alternately stretching and heading orientation with successive courses—and no use whatever is made of queen closers. To the Dutch this is simply a variant of what they call a cross bond.

=== Two or more stretching course per heading course ===
A raking English garden wall bond

Scottish bond

American bond

==== English garden wall bond ====
This bond has three courses of stretchers between every course of headers.

For the standard English garden wall bond, headers are used as quoins for the middle stretching course in order to generate the lap, with queen closers as the penultimate brick at either end of the heading courses. A more complex set of quoins and queen closers is necessary to achieve the lap for a raking English garden wall bond.

The heading course in English garden wall bond sometimes features bricks of a different colour to its surrounding stretchers. In English chalk districts, flint is substituted for the stretchers, and the headers constitute a lacing course.

==== Scottish bond ====
This bond has five courses of stretchers between every course of headers.

The lap is generated by the use of headers as quoins for the even-numbered stretching courses, counting up from the previous heading course, with queen closers as the penultimate brick at either end of the heading courses.

==== American, or common bond ====
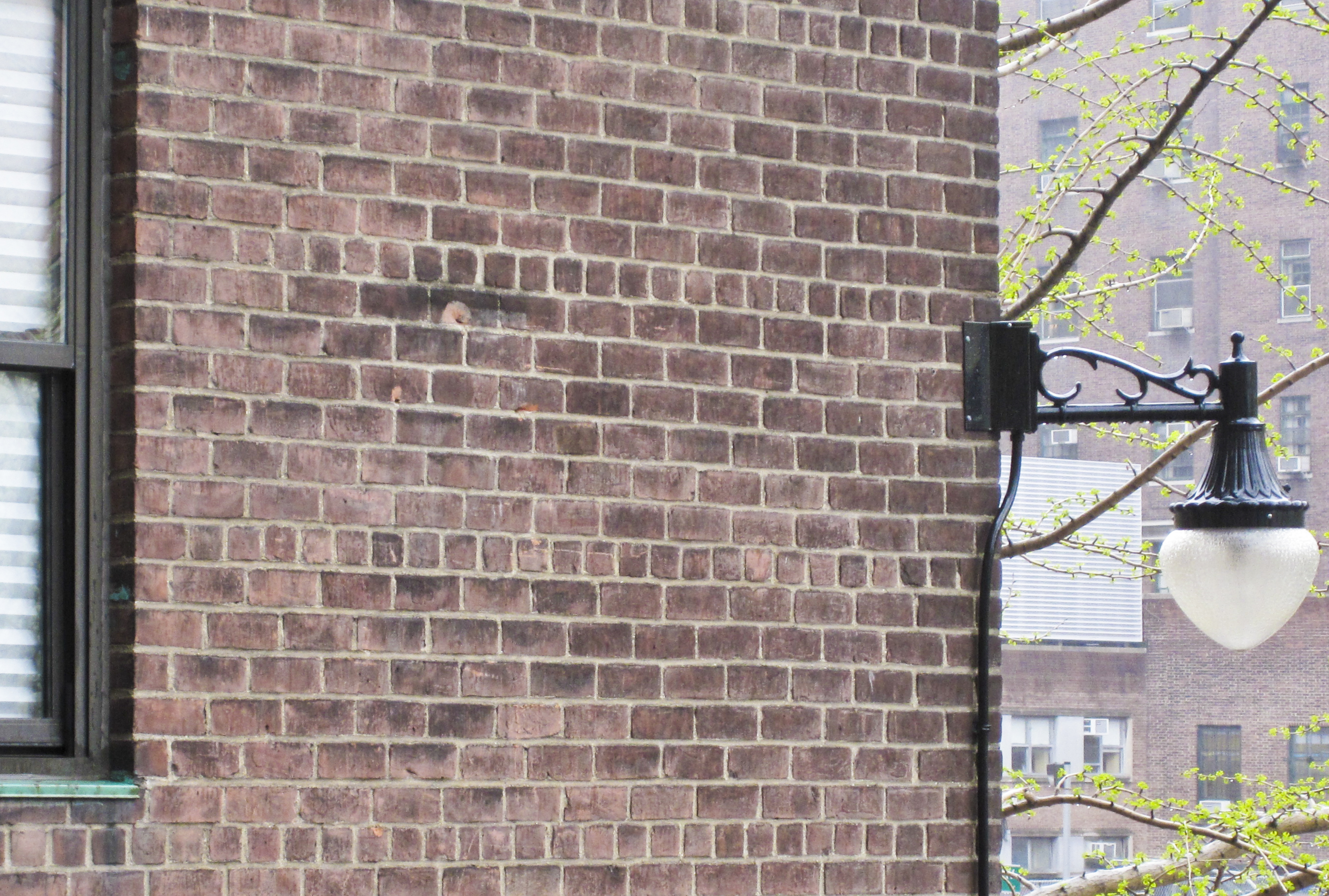
American bond, 5th Ave, Harlem, New York

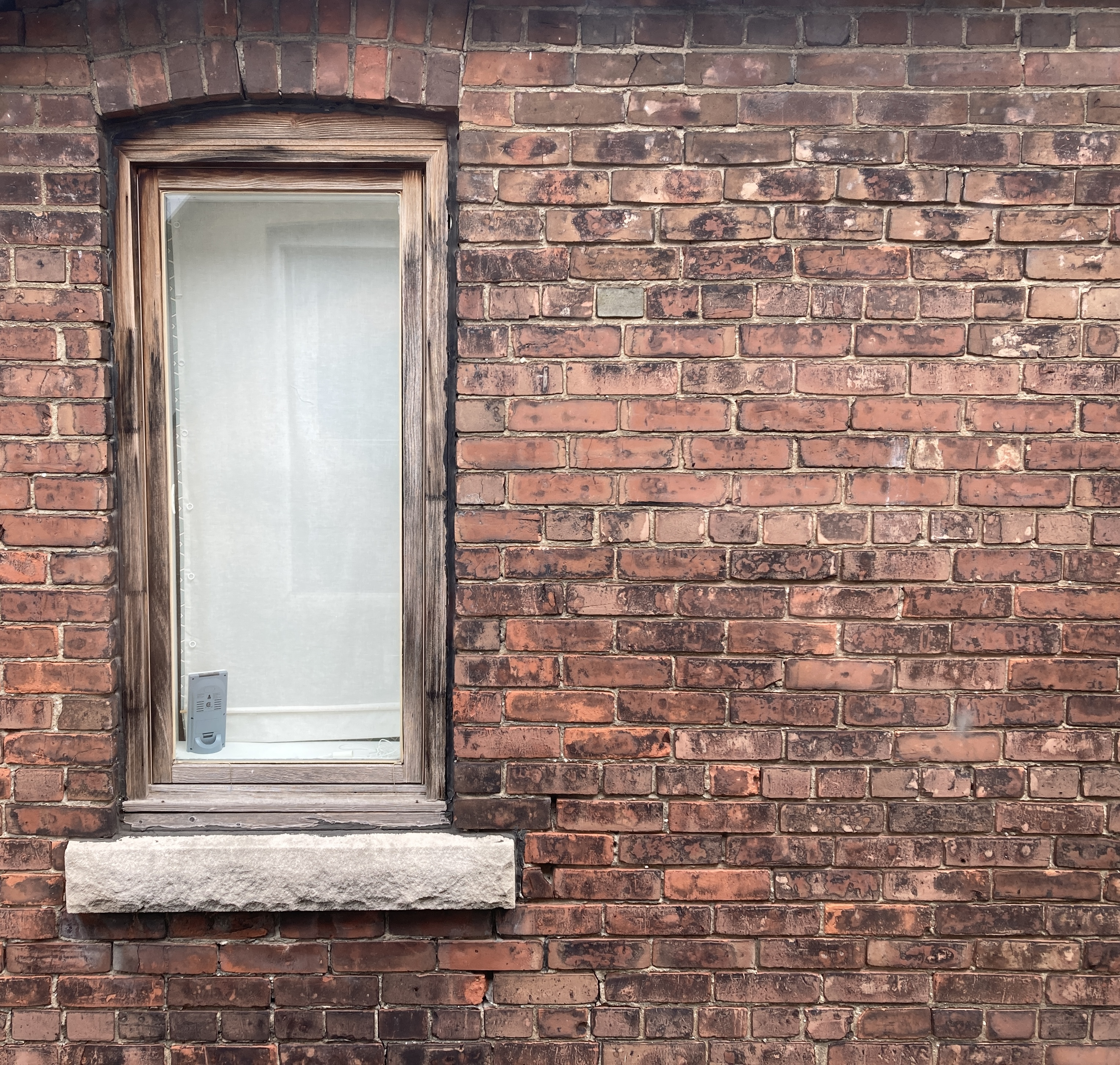
Common bond on an Edwardian semi-detached house in Toronto's Little Italy

This bond may have between three and nine courses of stretchers between each course of headers. Six is the most common number of courses of stretchers.

Headers are used as quoins for the even-numbered stretching courses, counting up from the previous heading course, in order to achieve the necessary off-set in a standard American bond, with queen closers as the penultimate brick at either end of the heading courses.

The brick Clarke–Palmore House in Henrico County, Virginia, has a lower level built in 1819 described as being American bond of three to five stretching courses between each heading course, and an upper level built in 1855 with American bond of six to seven stretching courses between each heading course.

=== Only stretching or heading courses ===
Header bond

Stretcher bond

A raking stretcher bond

==== Header bond ====
All bricks in this bond are headers, but for the lap-generating quoin three-quarter bat which offsets each successive courses by half a header.

Header bond is often used on curving walls with a small radius of curvature. In Lewes, Sussex, England, many small buildings are constructed in this bond, using blue coloured bricks and vitrified surfaces.

==== Running bond, or stretcher bond ====
All bricks in this bond are stretchers, with the bricks in each successive course staggered by half a stretcher. Headers are used as quoins on alternating stretching courses in order to achieve the necessary offset.

It is the simplest repeating pattern, and will create a wall one header thick.

==== Raking stretcher bond ====
Also consists entirely of courses of stretchers, but with the bricks in each successive course staggered in some pattern other than that of standard stretcher bond.

=== One or more stretching courses per alternating course ===
==== Flemish stretcher bond ====
Flemish stretcher bond

Flemish stretcher bond separates courses of alternately laid stretchers and headers, with a number of courses of stretchers alone. Brickwork in this bond may have between one and four courses of stretchers to one course after the Flemish manner. The courses of stretchers are often but not always staggered in a raking pattern.

=== Courses of mixed rowlocks and shiners ===
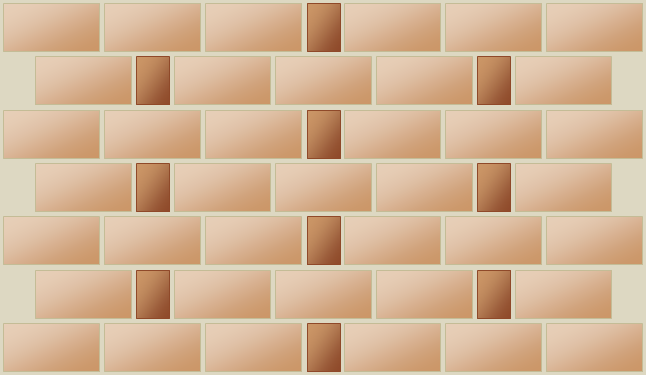
Rat-trap bond

==== Rat-trap bond ====
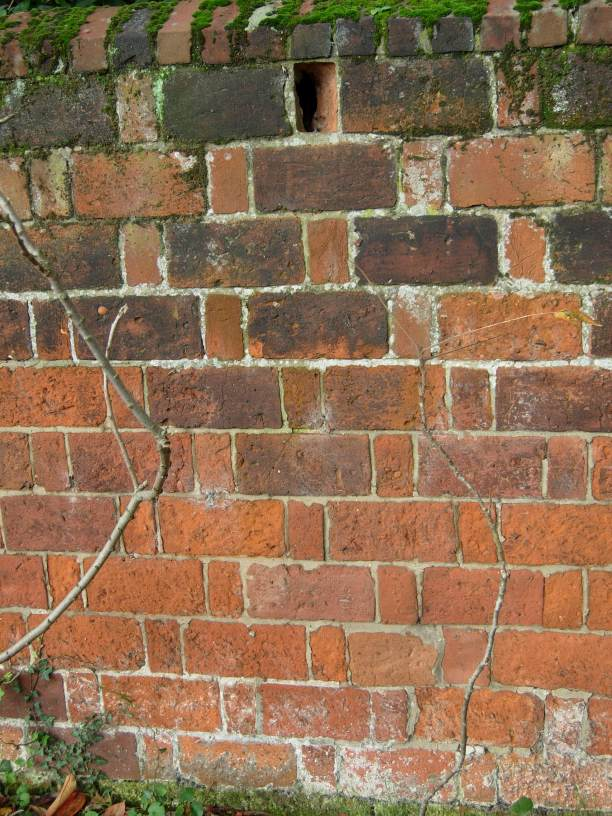
Brick wall laid in rat-trap bond near Angelsea Road, Wivenhoe, Essex, England

Rat-trap bond (also Chinese bond) substantially observes the same pattern as Flemish bond, but consists of rowlocks and shiners instead of headers and stretchers. This gives a wall with an internal cavity bridged by the rowlocks, hence the reference to rat-traps.

=== One shiner course per heading course ===
==== Dearne's bond ====
Dearne's bond substantially observes the same pattern as English bond, but uses shiners in place of stretchers.

== Non-load-bearing bonds ==
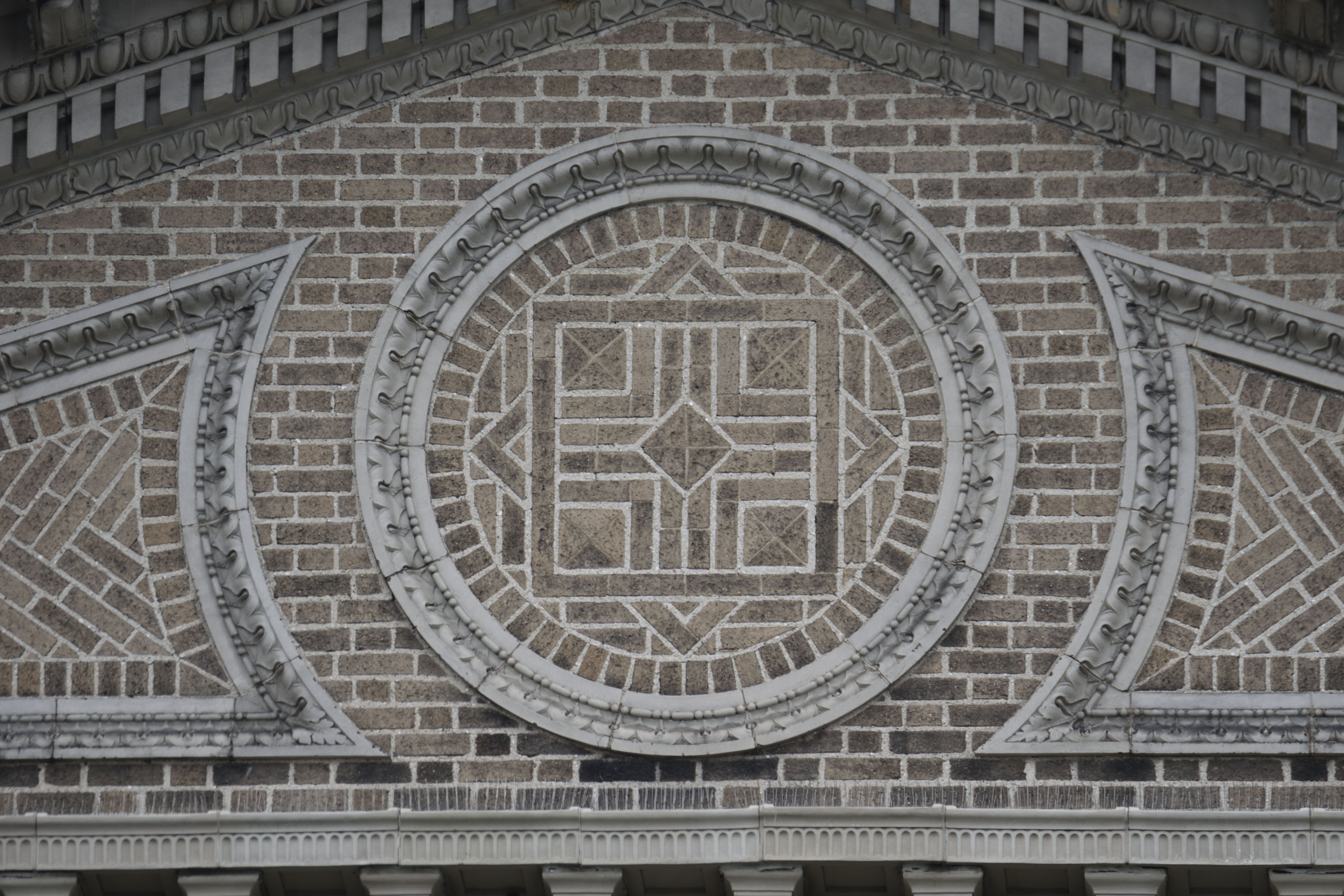
Decorative brickwork above the entrance to First Congregational Church in Toledo, Ohio, 2019

=== Courses of mixed shiners and sailors ===
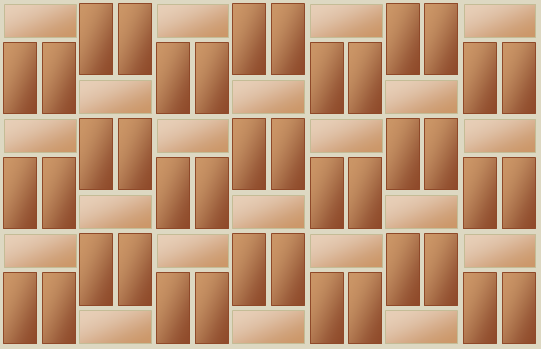
Single basket weave bond

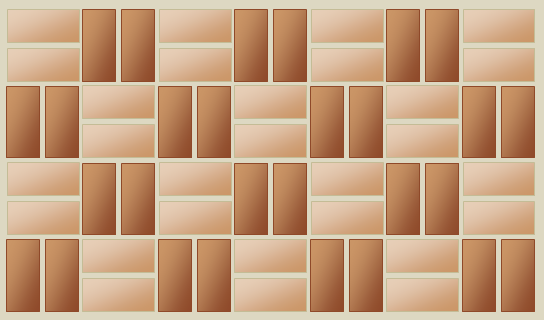
Double basket weave bond

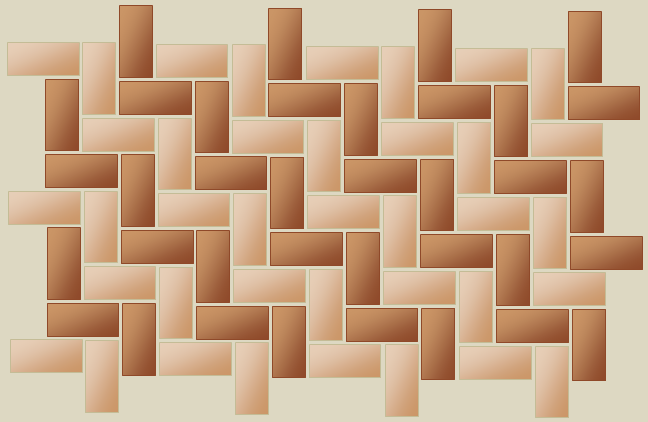
90° herringbone bond

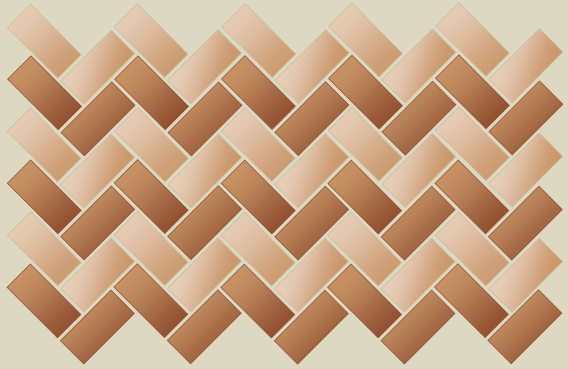
45° herringbone bond

==== Single basket weave bond ====
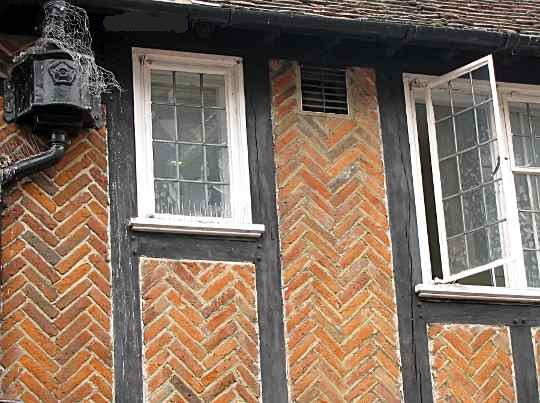
45° herringbone bond, Canterbury, UK

A row of single basket weave bond comprises pairs of sailors laid side-by-side, capped with a shiner, alternating with pairs of sailors laid side-by-side sat atop a shiner. Subsequent rows are identical and aligned with those above.

==== Double basket weave bond ====
A row of double basket weave bond comprises pairs of shiners laid atop one another, alternating with pairs of sailors laid side by side. The following row is off-set so the pair of shiners sits below the pair of sailors in the row above. This results in bricks arranged in pairs in a square grid so that the join between each pair is perpendicular to the join of the four pairs around it.

==== Herringbone bond ====
The herringbone pattern (opus spicatum) made by placing soldiers next to stretchers or vice versa (i.e. headers perpendicular) making 'L' shapes, nesting each L in the same order of laying. Thin bricks are more common. The pattern is usually rotated by 45° to create a completely vertical (plumb) succession of 'V' shapes. It follows either the left or right brick forms the tip of the v in any wall. Herringbone is sometimes used as infill in timber-framed buildings.

=== Brickwork built around square fractional-sized bricks ===
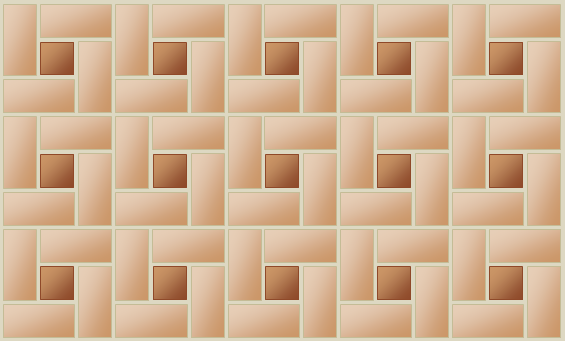
Pinwheel bond

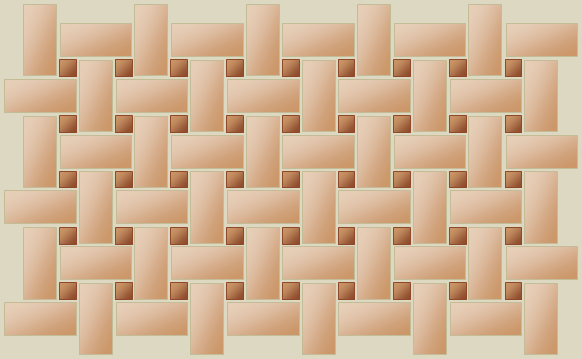
Della Robbia bond

==== Pinwheel bond ====
Pinwheel bond is made of four bricks surrounding a square half-brick, repeated in a square grid.

==== Della Robbia bond ====
A pattern made of four bricks surrounding a square brick, one-quarter the size of a half-brick. It is designed to resemble woven cloth. Another, similar pattern is called the interlacing bond.

== Diapering ==
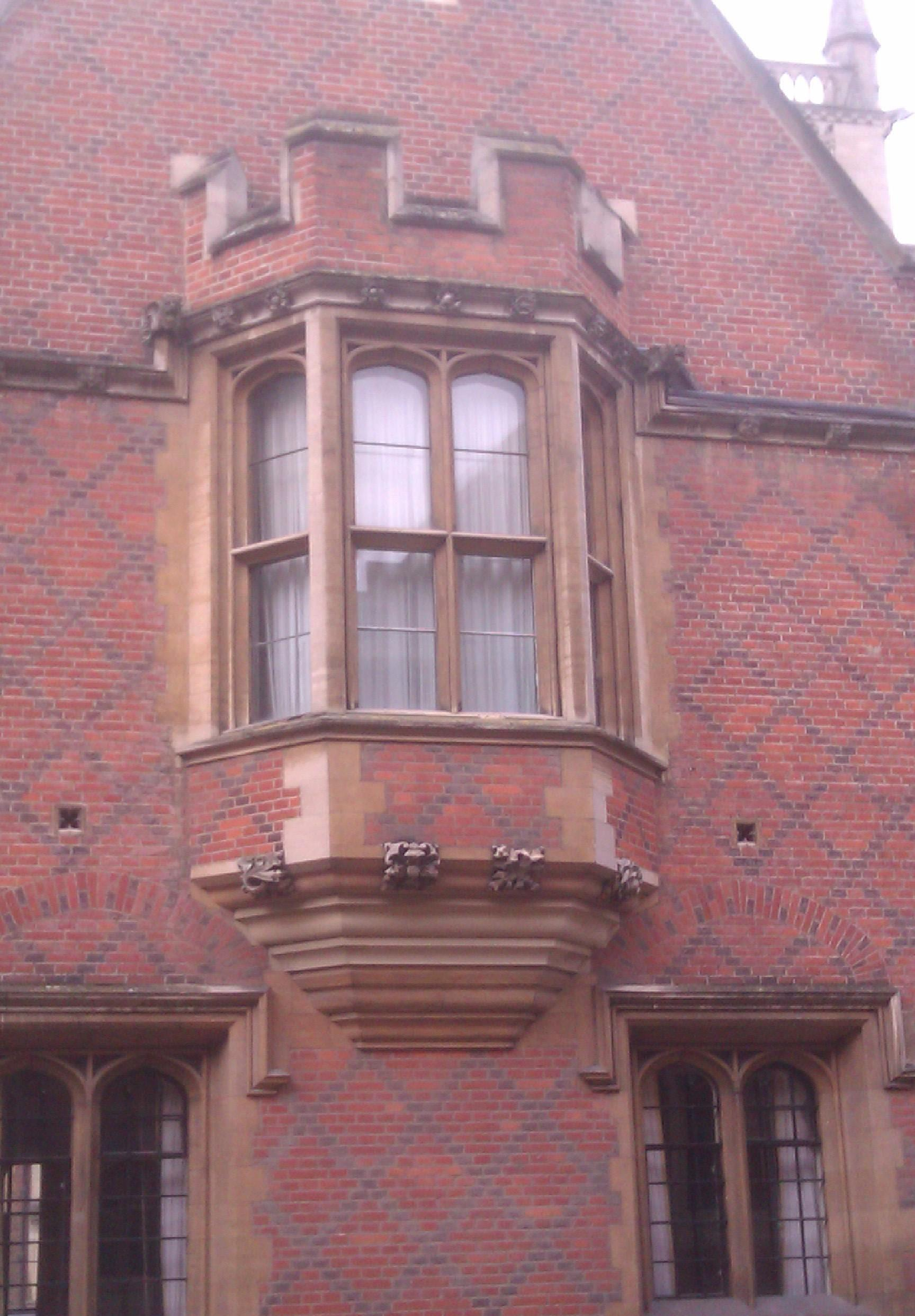
Flemish diagonal bond at St John's College, Cambridge

Brickwork formed into a diamond pattern is called diapering.

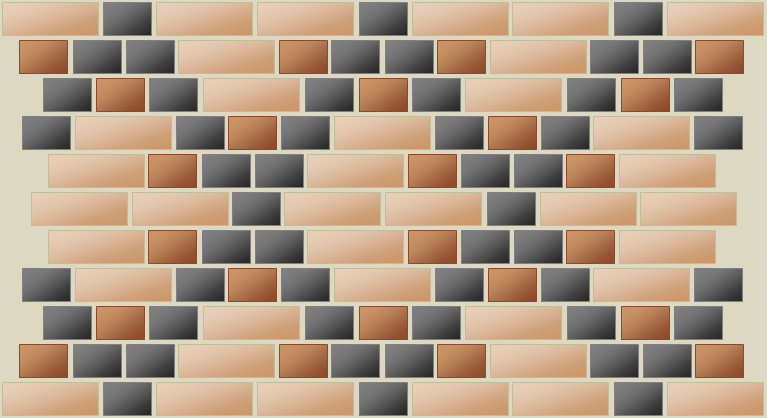
Flemish diagonal bond

=== Flemish diagonal bond ===
Flemish diagonal bond comprises a complex pattern of stretcher courses alternating with courses of one or two stretchers between headers, at various offsets, such that over ten courses, a diamond-shaped pattern appears.

== Damp-proof courses ==
Moisture may ascend into a building from the foundation of a wall or gain ingress into a building from a wet patch of ground, where it meets a solid wall. The manifest result of this process is called damp. One of many methods of resisting such ingresses of water is to construct the wall with several low courses of dense engineering bricks such as Staffordshire blue bricks. This method of damp proofing appears as a distinctive navy blue band running around the circumference of a building. It is only partially effective, as in spite of the lower courses of brick being more moisture resistant the mortar bedding and perpends joining the bricks remain permeable.

== See also ==
- Brick Expressionism – Architectural style
- Ceramic building material – Archaeological term for baked clay building material
- Construction – Process of building or assembling a building or infrastructure
- Glossary of British bricklaying – List of bricklaying terms and their meanings
- Masonry – Building of structures from individual units of stone, bricks, or blocks
- Polychrome brickwork – Use of bricks of different colours for decoration
- Tuckpointing – Method of pointing brickwork

== Bibliography ==
- Brunskill, R.W. (1997). Brick Building in Britain. London: Victor Gollancz in association with Peter Crawley. An imprint of the Cassell Group. ISBN 0575065354.
- Emmitt, Stephen & Gorse, Christopher A. (2010). Barry's Introduction to Construction of Buildings. Wiley-Blackwell. ISBN 9781405188548.
- Lloyd, Nathaniel (1925). A History of English Brickwork. The Antique Collectors' Club Ltd. ISBN 0907462367.
- Nicholson, Peter (1823). The New Practical Builder, and Workman's Companion. Thomas Kelly, 17 Paternoster Row, London.
- The Architectural Review. 9 Queen Anne's Gate, Westminster, S.W.1. London: The Architectural Press. May 1936.
- Plumridge, Andrew and Meulenkamp, Wim. (1993). Brickwork: Architecture and Design. New York: Harry N Abrams.
- Smeaton, A. C. (1837). The Builder's Pocket Manual; Containing the Elements of Building, Surveying and Architecture; with Practical Rules and Instructions in Carpentry, Bricklaying, Masonry &c. Barnard's Inn, Holborn: M. Taylor.
- Sovinski, Rob W. (1999). Brick in the Landscape. A Practical Guide to Specification and Design. New York: John Wiley & Sons.
