= Clarke–Palmore House =

Historic house in Virginia, United States

- U.S. National Register of Historic Places
- Virginia Landmarks Register
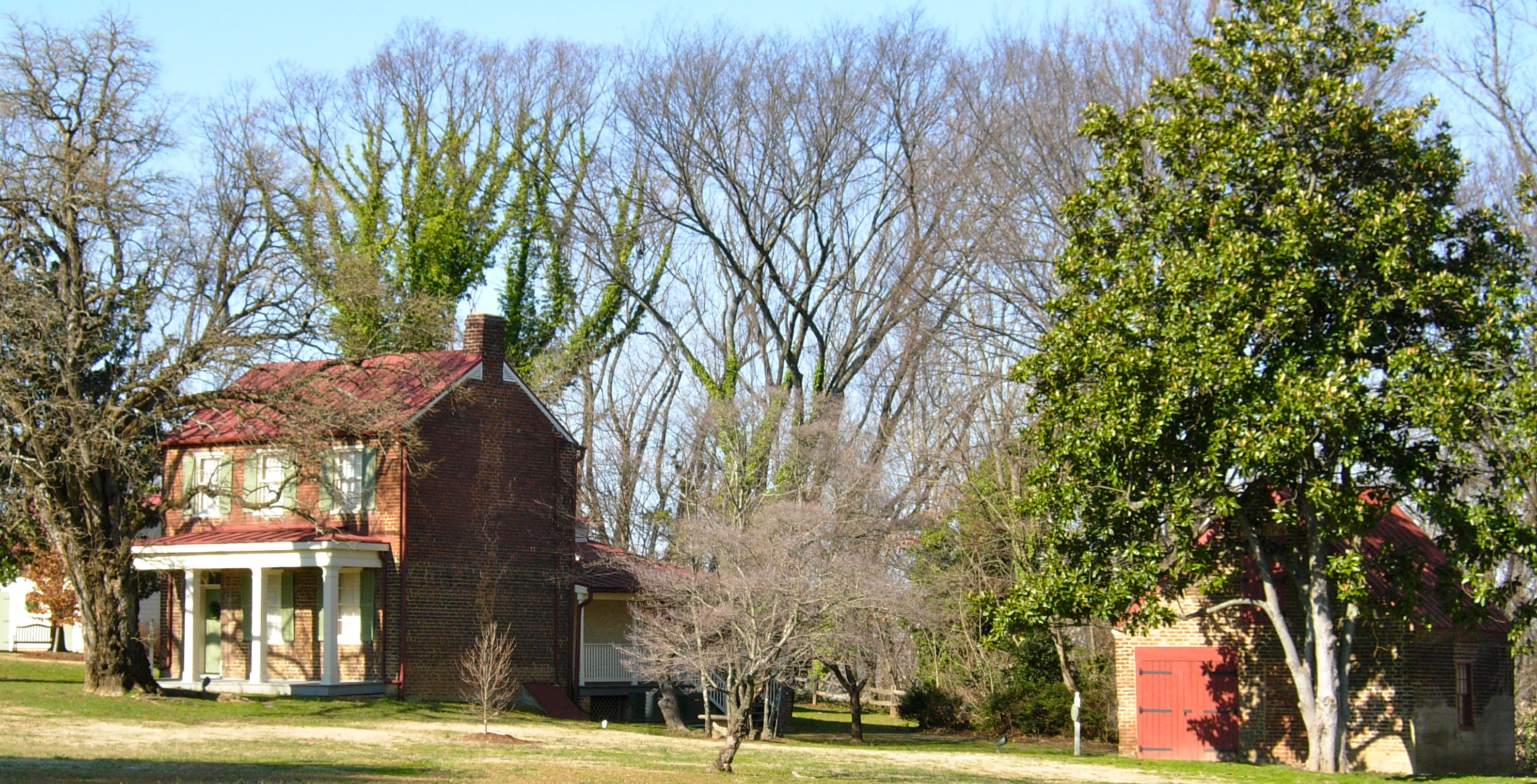

- Location within Virginia Location within the United States
- Nearest city: Richmond, Virginia
- Coordinates: 37°30′28″N 77°24′24″W
- Area: 10.3 acres (4.2 ha)
- Built: 1819
- Architect: Clarke, John W.; Parlmore, John W.
- NRHP reference No.: 04000576
- VLR No.: 043-0085

Significant dates
- Added to NRHP: June 2, 2004
- Designated VLR: March 17, 2004

The Clarke–Palmore House, also known as Clarke Home, was built as a brick farmhouse in 1819 and expanded in 1855. Its first floor level, built in 1819, is described as being American bond brickwork of 3 to 5 stretcher courses between each header course. Its upper level, built in 1855, is of American bond with 6 to 7 stretcher courses between each header course.

It was listed on the National Register of Historic Places in 2004.

The house and pumphouse on its property are "a reminder of Henrico County's agricultural past." They are owned by Henrico County and open to the public for events and by appointment as a 1930s period farmhouse.
